The 1944 King's Birthday Honours, celebrating the official birthday of King George VI, were announced on 2 June 1944 for the United Kingdom and British Empire, New Zealand, and South Africa.

Being near the end of World War II, it included a great many military personnel who were Mentioned in dispatches.

The recipients of honours are displayed here as they were styled before their mention.

Mentioned in Despatches

Royal Air Force
Acting Air Marshal
O. T. Boyd, .

Air Vice-Marshals

A. J. Capel, .
C. R. Carr, .
The Hon. R. A. Cochrane, .
T. W. Elmhirst, .

R. D. Oxland, .
A. E. Panter, .
E. A. B. Rice, .
J. M. Robb, .

Acting Air Vice-Marshal
J. A. Gray, .

Air Commodores

G. R. Beamish, 
G. K. Biggs, .
E. C. Hudleston, .
A. S. G. Lee, .
R. L. Ragg, .
J. H. T. Simpson, .

S. C. Strafford, .
A. E. Sutton-Jones.
T. C. Traill, .
A. H. Wann.
J. Whitford, .

Acting Air Commodores

N. H. D'Arth, .
C. L. Falconer, .
E. M. F. Grundy, .
A. Hesketh, .
H. J. Kirkpatrick, .
A. W. B. Macdonald, .

S. L. G. Pope, .
P. Pyne, .
L. Taylor.
G. W. Tuttle, .
R. Whyte, RAFVR.
J. Whitley.

Group Captains

C. D. Adams, .
J. M. Adams.
N. S. Allinson.
R. E. Bain.
S. G. Beaumont, Auxiliary Air Force.
J. R. Bell, .
S. G. Birch.
D. W. F. Bonham-Carter.
A. Bowden, Reserve of Air Force Officers.
J. E. W. Bowles, .
V. S. Bowling.
J. Bradbury, .
The Rev. D. G. Brook, RAFVR.
E. Burton.
C. W. Busk, .
C. H. Cahill, .
The Rev. H. J. W. Carpenter, RAFVR.
N. Carter, .
W. G. Cheshire.
M. V. M. Clube, Auxiliary Air Force.
R. W. P. Collings, .
A. R. Combe.
W. R. Cox.
A. C. Evans-Evans.
F. G. H. Ewens.
V. S. Ewing.
R. C. Field.
E. S. Finch.
H. J. Gemmel.
G. E. Gordon-Duff.
R. K. Hamblin.
G. N. Hancock.
G. W. Hayes.
E. A. Hodgson.
C. V. Howes, .
J. W. Hunt.

P. W. Johnson, .
J. W. T. Jones.
J. M. Kilpatrick, .
G. M. Knocker.
R. B. Lees, .
J. B. Lynch.
R. C. Mead, .
H. W. Mermagen, .
R. L. Mills.
A. T. Monks.
W. E. Oulton, .
J. T. Paine.
I. R. Parker, Auxiliary Air Force.
S. P. A. Patmore.
M. G. Philpott.
The Rev. N. F. Porter.
F. C. Read.
A. P. Revington, .
B. V. Reynolds, .
C. S. Riccard.
C. Ryley, .
R. G. Seymour.
M. S. Shapcott.
W. C. Sheen, .
D. M. Somerville.
H. F. G. Southey.
C. H. A. Stevens.
R. A. T. Stowell, .
W. V. Strugnell, .
R. T. Taaffe, .
C. McC. Vincent, .
W. J. G. Walker, .
C. Walter, .
H. M. S. Wright.
J. F. Young, .

Acting Group Captains

K. S. Batchelor, Reserve of Air Force Officers.
P. R. Beare, .
C. H. Brandon.
R. K. Brougham.
C. Broughton.
E. S. Butler, .
A. M. Carey, Reserve of Air Force Officers.
B. A. Chacksfield.
D. de B. Clark, Auxiliary Air Force.
W. N. Gumming, .
J. F. H. du Boulay.
T. H. England, .
D. O. Finlay, .
W. S. Gardner, .
G. J. Grindell, .
T. L. E. B. Guinness, Auxiliary Air Force Reserve of Officers.
J. F. Hobler.

Sir A. P. Hope (90124), Auxiliary Air Force.
E. C. Kidd, .
P. C. F. Lawton, Auxiliary Air Force Reserve of Officers.
R. H. A. Leigh.
J. C. Millar.
O. A. Morris, Reserve of Air Force Officers.
G. C. Pinkerton, Auxiliary Air Force.
F. C. Richardson.
D. G. H. Spencer, .
D. L. Thomson, .
W. H. M. Walker, Reserve of Air Force Officers.
E. A. Warfield, .
H. McC. White, Reserve of Air Force Officers.
S. C. Widdows, .
J. Worrall.
R. H. Young, .

Wing Commanders

E. G. Ambridge (31011).
P. E. Axon, (77800), RAFVR.
R. A. C. Barclay (33017).
J. N. Baxter (28177).
R. G. Bowditch (05209).
F. E. Burton, (37623), Reserve of Air Force Officers.
J. S. Carslaw (23146).
R. St. H. Clarke (03185).
R. L. Edward (05104).
J. V. Edwards (75205), RAFVR.
R. W. B. Ellis (82914), RAFVR.
R. A. Foggin (72832), RAFVR.
R. G. Frith (90420), Auxiliary Air Force.
G. D. Garvin (34237).
F. P. Gee (31149).
R. D. George, (75777), RAFVR.
A. Gollan (21215).
R. W. Gray (72234), RAFVR.
A. Hanglin (35153).
G. H. Harrison (35093).
R. A. C. Holme (87632), RAFVR.
T. F. Hosking (73641), RAFVR.
W. L. Houlbrook (29242).
C. E. Hunter (21192).
N. H. Husbands, (29169).
J. D. S. Huxley (36082).
J. H. Irvin (37405).
R. K. Jeffries (33262).
F. W. Judge (21193).
W. I. G. Kerby (36052).
C. W. Kidd (90048), Auxiliary Air Force.
G. V. Lane, (37602), Reserve of Air Force Officers.
R. T. Langton, (45973).
J. Lindsay (35104).
R. E. W. Little (72308), RAFVR.
C. H. E. Lyster, (31024).
F. R. McAllister (37195).
V. H. A. McBratney, (34085).
R. H. McConnell, (33268).
D. S. MacDonald, (37451).
G. B. Macgibbon, (23312).

G. M. Mackie (35118).
L. Mathias (33270).
A. R. Morton (31014).
E. J. Moule (08005), RAFVR.
H. A. Murton (11193).
R. G. Musson (34129) (deceased).
A. J. Nicholas (35033).
M. G. F. Pedley, (37328).
T. C. Reep (21188).
D. W. Reid, (32062).
D. S. Robertson (40141).
The Rev. D. C. E. Rogers (38067).
E. N. Rooms, (36064).
N. S. Roupell, Reserve of Air Force Officers.
J. B. Russell, DSO (37125).
B. Samson (34249).
T. P. K. Scade, (76161), RAFVR.
F. H. Searl (22229), Reserve of Air Force Officers.
C. E. Sims (36062).
G. A. L. Sinclair-Hill (72722), RAFVR.
F. M. Smith (37613), Reserve of Air Force Officers.
L. Spencer (35137).
C. H. Stilwell (05092).
K. C. M. Stock (90960), Auxiliary Air Force.
V. C. F. Streatfield (27151), RAFVR.
G. H. Stuart, (23170).
J. H. Styles (35071).
V. H. Tomkins (23122).
E. M. Trounson (75672), RAFVR.
B. A. Vautier (35113).
J. C. Vickery (79017), RAFVR.
N. W. Wakelin (32211).
H. Walker (19040), Reserve of Air Force Officers.
T. D. Weldon, .
D. E. B. Wheeler (33103).
D. W. Williams (33128).
V. F. Williams (77331), RAFVR.
H. R. Withers (21163).
E. N. D. Worsley (21033).
H. Wright, (35250).
A. W. Younghusband (21164).

Acting Wing Commanders

G. W. Adams (73057), RAFVR.
N. Alexandra (28075).
H. Allsopp (31486).
P. W. Arbon, (41893), Reserve of Air Force Officers.
G. P. Arden, (72039), RAFVR.
A. T. Atkins (43319).
W. P. Bain (39480), Reserve of Air Force Officers.
R. Baker, (81930), RAFVR.
R. A. Barnett (22157).
H. T. Barton-Chapple (76081), RAFVR.
L. R. Batten (82318), RAFVR.
C. E. Beer (44345).
J. D. Bisdee, (76575), RAFVR.
A. Blande (90668), Auxiliary Air Force.
S. P. A. Bousfield (72791), RAFVR.
R. B. Brown (21051).
W. F. Bryanton (80057), RAFVR.
F. J. B. Budgett (85095), RAFVR.
J. H. G. Bugden (21255).
L. G. Burnand (37847), Reserve of Air Force Officers.
W. T. Burnett, (40076), Reserve of Air Force Officers.
H. B. B. Burns (31120).
N. Bury (73115), RAFVR.
D. O. Butler (37790).
R. E. C. Cadman (90387), Auxiliary Air Force.
D. W. S. Clark, (36213).
W. T. Cleasby, (10221).
C. M. Clementi (72465), RAFVR.
W. M. Collins, (43848).
A. R. Cooper (80678), RAFVR.
W. Corden (35401).
R. E. Craven, (39859).
R. P. Crawshaw (60900), RAFVR.
C. H. Cronkshaw, (43583).
A. E. Crouchley (76376), RAFVR.
D. H. Dabbs (09098), RAFVR.
G. E. Daniel (84130), RAFVR.
G. Dod (35331).
J. C. Downie (35306).
A. E. Dunlop, (44156).
R. G. Dutton, (39072), Reserve of Air Force Officers.
E. W. W. Ellis (39935).
G. H. Everitt, (81032), RAFVR.
J. W. Faulkner, (35265).
B. W. Finn (46386).
I. Forward (43442).
J. Freeman (89012), RAFVR.
J. F. Freeston (90697), Auxiliary Air Force.
C. R. E. Freezer, (72557), RAFVR.
M. W. Gallagher (103175), RAFVR.
C. Gardner (09255).
L. E. Giles, (42213), Reserve of Air Force Officers.
J. R. Gillespie (70247), Reserve of Air Force Officers.
W. J. Grace, (80664), RAFVR.
E. J. Gracie, (29090), Reserve of Air Force Officers.
Sir R. B. Graham (79643), RAFVR.
G. B. Grayling, (72177), RAFVR.
C. R. Griffiths (90228), Auxiliary Air Force Reserve of Officers.
T. J. Gunn, (41401), Reserve of Air Force Officers.
J. Hamilton (31222), Reserve of Air Force Officers.
R. N. Hawes (86788), RAFVR.
R. M. Hayes (76090), RAFVR.
F. H. J. Heading (31109).
B. Heath, (90818).
H. J. Hickey (44632).
J. H. Hodge (90179), Auxiliary Air Force Reserve of Officers.

P. Honey, (35231).
J. E. Horton, (35268).
D. M. Jack (90170), Auxiliary Air Force.
W. E. F. Jennings (76895), RAFVR.
R. B. Johnson (66118), RAFVR.
G. H. Jones (73970), RAFVR.
J. S. Laird (37654), Reserve of Air Force Officers.
H. R. Lawson, (43121).
F. E. Lord (82410), RAFVR.
W. Louw, (41190), Reserve of Air Force Officers.
A. McDowall, (89299), RAFVR.
J. C. MacGown (72766), RAFVR.
T. C. McIlroy (74176), RAFVR.
B. R. Macnamara (25123).
J. C. McWatters, (86655), RAFVR.
R. H. Mason (41127), Reserve of Air Force Officers.
D. V. G. Mawhood (40314), Reserve of Air Force Officers.
A. E. Miller (43585).
G. A. Miller (88310), RAFVR.
G. Milner (72892), RAFVR.
J. G. Minifie (39889), Reserve of Air Force Officers.
C. S. Morice, (03003).
J. E. M. Mould (31284).
C. N. A. Mumby (18058), RAFVR.
E. A. Natzio (86169), RAFVR.
J. H. Neal, (23295).
A. C. W. Norman (90121), Auxiliary Air Force Reserve of Officers.
J. H. Over (43672).
J. A. Payne (77990), RAFVR.
F. J. Powell, (74207), RAFVR.
R. C. Pretty (08056), RAFVR.
H. H. Rase (77739), RAFVR.
J. W. Rayner (70565), RAFVR.
J. A. C. Robinson (35196).
R. H. Scott (90221), Auxiliary Air Force.
F. J. Seabrook (43588).
R. S. Searle (82883), RAFVR.
L. W. Skey, (39423), Reserve of Air Force Officers.
D. B. Smith (70630), RAFVR.
M. J. Smith (87633), RAFVR.
N. L. Smith (37916), Reserve of Air Force Officers.
A. G. C. Somerhough (24075).
G. M. Somers (44321).
R. C. T. Speir (80852), RAFVR.
J. A. G. Stuart (73415), RAFVR.
R. M. Thomas (21035).
P. H. Thomson (72244), RAFVR.
C. Tomkins (43497).
E. F. Tonge (40034), Reserve of Air Force Officers.
S. E. Townson (46179).
H. L. Tudor (76532), RAFVR.
R. C. Udall (79254), RAFVR.
T. A. Vigors, (33554)
H. Walters, (35379)
G. H. Wass (76383), RAFVR.
F. M. N. Watts (44491).
R. Watts-Jones (88093), RAFVR.
W. H. Westgate, (44275).
R. G. J. White (31168).
E. F. Wilde (43671).
R. W. Williams (35390).
A. G. Wincott (37841), Reserve of Air Force Officers.
H. S. Wolff (72292), RAFVR.
A. S. Woodgate (31185).
M. Wyatt, (37994), Reserve of Air Force Officers.

Squadron Leaders

A. D. M. Adams, (555).
The Rev. W. J. Adams (38092), Reserve of Air Force Officers.
G. C. Alington (40974), Reserve of Air Force Officers.
A. J. Allsop (45131)
W. H. Ashbee (74410).
T. E. M. Ashton (65464), RAFVR.
The Rev. A. Attard (67565), RAFVR.
A. W. Attrill (43801).
S. P. Austin (21311), Reserve of Air Force Officers.
G. G. Avis, (39774), Reserve of Air Force Officers.
W. S. Baddeley, (78377), RAFVR.
S. R. Baden (72155), RAFVR.
The Rev L. S. R. Badham (81317), RAFVR.
A. Banister (85070), RAFVR.
J. F. R. Barker (69532), RAFVR.
N. D. Barratt (113081), RAFVR.
L. E. Barry (72607), RAFVR.
R. F. Bateman (66066), RAFVR.
C. R. Beaston (73848), Reserve of Air Force Officers.
B. J. E. Belcher, (72609), RAFVR.
J. P. Bennett (72252), RAFVR.
G. L. W. Boswell (41104), Reserve of Air Force Officers.
M. N. Bradshaw-Jones (78200), RAFVR.
A. W. Bridger (31118).
D. L. Brocklesby, (73567), RAFVR.
The Rev. I. Brodie (88640), RAFVR (deceased).
B. J. Bugden (66115), RAFVR.
R. H. Burdon-Cooper (91042), Auxiliary Air Force.
R. J. Bushell (90120), Auxiliary Air Force (deceased).
J. P. Cafferkey (03172), RAFVR.
P. C. Campbell (90822), Auxiliary Air Force.
S. Campling (43606).
J. W. Charnley.
M. R. Chassels (77090), RAFVR.
G. P. Collier (74457), RAFVR.
G. L. Couch (75118), RAFVR.
S. E. Craig, (45154).
A. J. Croft-Cohen (77445), RAFVR.
I. K. P. Cross, (39305), Reserve of Air Force Officers (deceased).
P. H. Curtis (31213).
J. S. Darrant (43500).
E. A. Dearman (81808), RAFVR.
L. E. De Rouet (80680), RAFVR.
M. V. de Satge (27240), Reserve of Air Force Officers.
P. C. W. Disney (70183).
W. Dixon (86929), RAFVR.
The Rev. A. D. Dobson (106476), RAFVR.
W. E. B. Bowling (60351), RAFVR.
H. W. Durtnell (75423), RAFVR.
H. C. Edenborough (74489), RAFVR.
N. A. Edwards (36159), Reserve of Air Force Officers.
C. E. Ellis (83542), RAFVR.
H. S. Elton, (90667), Auxiliary Air Force.
J. L. T. Evans (88940), RAFVR.
A. G. Evenden (35226).
D. C. Farquharson (88166), RAFVR.
P. J. Ferguson (90167), Auxiliary Air Force.
A. Fisher (43210).
C. Freakes (43559).
The Rev. J. L. Gammon (89290), RAFVR.
A. R. Glading (35308).
A. T. Goodrich (136148), RAFVR.
G. G. G. Graves (73753), RAFVR.
R. C. C. Green (80684), RAFVR.
T. L. Grey (10099), RAFVR.
G. P. Grieve (87770), RAFVR.
R. Grimshaw (90592), Auxiliary Air Force.
D. F. Hackett (72338), RAFVR.
O. R. W. Hammerbeck (39822).
The Rev. T. Hankin (77527), RAFVR.
R. A. Harding (44941).
The Rev. J. C. Harkus (77268), RAFVR.
G. J. Haynes (78119), RAFVR.
R. W. Head (31223), Reserve of Air Force Officers.

D. E. Henderson (31273), Reserve of Air Force Officers.
E. G. F. Hill (31323), Reserve of Air Force Officers.
J. T. C. Hillman (85728), RAFVR.
R. W. Holloway (90806), Auxiliary Air Force.
J. S. F. Hood (76171), RAFVR.
J. F. Houchin (72697), RAFVR.
J. V. M. Howe (87921), RAFVR.
H. Hudson, (44008).
The Rev. H. T. Hughes (106470), RAFVR.
C. F. Hunt (35393).
H. J. Hyde (46065).
H. F. Jacob (45504).
J. K. A. Jeakes, (04077).
F. L. Jenkins (44354)
The Rev. A. B. Jestice (106471), RAFVR.
B. P. Jones (37739), Reserve of Air Force Officers.
F. P. Joyce (40303), Reserve of Air Force Officers.
J. T. Kemp (82023), RAFVR.
A. H. E. King (74961), RAFVR.
The Rev. W. D. Kivlehan (108817), RAFVR.
A. B. Knowles (43429), RAFVR.
V. J. Lambert (43558).
S. H. Latham (33489).
E. R. L. Lewis (79417), RAFVR.
C. Y. McGlashan (38073), Reserve of Air Force Officers.
M. L. Maley (72102), RAFVR.
H. C. R. Marten (117099), RAFVR.
V. E. Mearles (75713), RAFVR.
H. N. Miller (70464), RAFVR.
W. L. Mills (35359).
L. D. G. Morrison (70477), RAFVR.
L. H. Morse (76172), RAFVR.
L. R. Mumby (31235).
J. B. Murphy (70933), Reserve of Air Force Officers.
G. W. Newman (80749), RAFVR.
H. F. N. Nicholls (88076), RAFVR.
J. L. O'Brien (45262).
C. A. C. O'Connor, (77603), RAFVR.
H. G. A. Orbell (21281).
F. G. G. Parsons (43222).
J. A. Partridge (77450), RAFVR.
The Rev. U. P. Perring (74807), RAFVR.
E. G. Pinckney (82130), RAFVR.
G. W. B. Plant (68253), RAFVR.
D. G. Potter (44638).
The Rev. G. Price (84873), RAFVR.
G. W. Robertson (100111), RAFVR.
R. H. Rodber (44146).
P. G. M. Ridsdale (31346), Reserve of Air Force Officers.
G. H. Seeley (43581).
J. H. Simpson, (117583), RAFVR.
F. H. Smith (62456), RAFVR.
The Rev. H. A. Smith-Masters (88380), RAFVR.
The Rev. G. E. Sparrowe (82496), RAFVR.
J. N. Stacey, (41217), Reserve of Air Force Officers.
D. Stevenson, (77900), RAFVR.
W. H. Stratton, (40152), Reserve of Air Force Officers.
A. G. Stringer (76106), RAFVR.
R. F. Stubbs (72497), RAFVR.
A. S. Summers (35839).
F. H. Taylor (80275), RAFVR.
H. W. Taylor (44624).
J. G. Tedd, RAFVR.
H. Thrower (75865), RAFVR.
T. P. F. Trudgian (21238).
C. G. Vandyk (74998), RAFVR.
J. Watson, (78230), RAFVR.
J. R. Watson (101135), RAFVR.
V. H. Webb (21313).
J. P. Wells (37702), Reserve of Air Force Officers.
P. H. V. Wells (72098), RAFVR.
G. P. Wildish (40275), Reserve of Air Force Officers.
A. D. Wilson (76183), RAFVR.
The Rev J. L. Wright (75078), RAFVR.

Acting Squadron Leaders

W. A. Allen (114665), RAFVR.
P. R. Allison (81748), RAFVR.
H. Ames (82246), RAFVR.
E. J. Andrews (44433).
E. P. Appleton (62451), RAFVR.
F. J. Ashton (82446), RAFVR.
C. A. Ayling (120189), RAFVR.
I. G. G. Ayscough (80718), RAFVR.
B. N. Bacchus (123874), RAFVR.
J. V. Baker (76162), RAFVR.
J. N. Bamborough (44618).
E. J. Bannister (87860), RAFVR.
C. A. Barnes, (62268), RAFVR.
J. E. M. Barnes, (72568), RAFVR.
S. A. Barnett (74416), RAFVR.
J. B. Barratt (80913), RAFVR.
O. E. Bartlett, (31421), Reserve of Air Force Officers.
W. N. Basson (78539), RAFVR.
A. A. Baxter (46788).
J. S. Belton, (61018), RAFVR.
M. M. Berman (101767).
C. E. Bicknell (44578).
H. F. Blackmore (78571), RAFVR.
J. P. Blackmore (45313).
J. F. Blick (74431), RAFVR.
A. G. Boggis (43890).
R. J. Bond (85732), RAFVR.
R. H. G. Boosey, (110552), RAFVR.
H. S. Bouchier (67189), RAFVR.
K. W. Boyer (68288), RAFVR.
R. L. Bradford, (89860), RAFVR.
C. F. Bradley (65493), RAFVR.
T. W. Branch (78508), RAFVR.
E. G. Brant (73854), RAFVR.
A. I. Bray (87098), RAFVR.
S. G. Briden (43649).
T. H. Bridgewater (60149), RAFVR.
A. T. Brock (70085), RAFVR.
R. H. C. Brousson (73102), RAFVR.
R. H. Brown (73106), RAFVR.
T. H. Bryant, (79840), RAFVR.
R. A. Buchanan (140579), RAFVR.
C. W. Buckingham, (47928).
N. A. Burges (83332), RAFVR.
H. S. Burrows (45350).
V. H. Buscall (86197), RAFVR.
R. E. Butcher (75929), RAFVR.
W. R. Butterfield, (67056), RAFVR.
J. R. A. Careless, (43263).
A. Carr (106785), RAFVR.
A. M. Chassels (78385), RAFVR.
J. D. Chown (79531), RAFVR.
J. G. Clark (113408), RAFVR.
P. R. Clapham (74451), RAFVR.
A. S. Coldham (84569), RAFVR.
J. Colover (85601), RAFVR.
J. S. Comper (79107), RAFVR.
P. Condon-Finucane (105993), RAFVR.
A. Connell (86198), RAFVR.
R. K. Cooke (61608), RAFVR.
L. G. Coombs (47352).
G. Cooper (48805).
V. F. Cottrell (82387), RAFVR.
S. Cox (117932), RAFVR.
J. T. Crawshaw (82878), RAFVR.
H. L. Creeth (128003), RAFVR.
F. J. S. Culley (106973), RAFVR.
L. S. Cundell (79361), RAFVR.
R. M. Cunningham (103707), RAFVR.
R. Cunningham-Jones, (82482), RAFVR.
A. S. Cussens (67614), RAFVR (deceased).
A. D'Agapeyeff (87808), RAFVR.
D. Dakin (68859), RAFVR.
D. J. D'Alton, (77206), RAFVR.
G. A. Davidson (112928), RAFVR.
C. W. A. Davies (43506).
H. W. C. Davies (82888), RAFVR.
K. Davies (41156), Reserve of Air Force Officers.
P. W. Davies (43817).
G. C. Day, (45974).
R. S. Day (81922), RAFVR.
C. A. Deacon, (46267).
E. D. Deane, (44443).
G. E. Dimmer (74792), RAFVR.
C. J. Dixon (81096), RAFVR.
J. R. Donald (114253), RAFVR.
G. H. Downing (72405), RAFVR.
G. W. Duncan (89867), RAFVR.
H. Eason (81297), RAFVR.
E. Eastwood (67721), RAFVR.
R. Efstathiou (79883), RAFVR.
G. A. L. Elliot, (43830).
L. D. Emblem (43011).
D. G. Evans (79135), RAFVR.
H. G. Evans (102227), RAFVR.
H. R. Evans (43508).
J. R. Fagan (89670), RAFVR.
W. C. Fahie (75521), RAFVR.
M. E. Faithful (82851), RAFVR.
H. B. Fearnley (88086), RAFVR.
F. H. Fearnside (48242).
B. Fellows (23428).
R. G. Fennell (76901), RAFVR.
P. Fitzpatrick (76527), RAFVR.
J. B. A. Fleming (43531).
R. B. Fleming (45172), Reserve of Air Force Officers.
G. C. Fletcher (119411), RAFVR.
H. T. Flintoft (89455), RAFVR.
A. Foden (73679), RAFVR.
A. H. Foord, (60790), RAFVR.
A. B. Ford (91086), Auxiliary Air Force.
G. Ford (68141), RAFVR.
A. D. Foster (64768), RAFVR.
S. A. Fox (70224), Reserve of Air Force Officers.
G. Frain,(90473), Auxiliary Air Force.
R. W. Fraser (83808), RAFVR.
L. Freeman (85142), RAFVR.
F. J. Friend (45020).
D. P. Furneaux, (77803), RAFVR.
J. E. Garlick (48294).
S. J. Gentle (107835), RAFVR.
A. R. Gillespie (91078), Auxiliary Air Force.
G. W. Gilpin, (89348), RAFVR.
L. T. Gilson (81168), RAFVR.
G. A. Glossop (44154).
E. F. Goater (45172).
K. W. Godfrey (77353), RAFVR.
D. C. Goodrich (47331).
R. Gore (78334), RAFVR.
W. G. K. Gorrie (115739), RAFVR.
L. Graves, (44464).
W. R. Green (104383), RAFVR.
E. J. Greenleaf (47663).
T. D. Griffin (84408), RAFVR.
V. G. Grylls, (79172), RAFVR.
D. L. Haines (117181), RAFVR.
H. Hall (68241), RAFVR.
A. S. Hamlett (45875).
A. G. G. Hanks (84793), RAFVR.
R. J. Hardy, (63461), RAFVR.
S. A. Hargrove (79464), RAFVR.
W. G. W. Harper (104648), RAFVR.
W. T. Harrington (47005).
C. H. Hartley (77139), RAFVR.
A. R. Harvey (79044), RAFVR.
J. Harvey (46675).
J. A. Hatton (84141), RAFVR.
C. S. Hawley,(77685), RAFVR.
J. C. F. Hayter, (36207).
P. W. Helmore, (89350), RAFVR.
H. Hemming, (122513), RAFVR.
R. H. R. Hemsted (107950), RAFVR (deceased).
E. H. Henton, (72672), RAFVR.
K. Herring (47089).
G. M. J. Hickman (74382), RAFVR.
H. C. Hill (117845), RAFVR.
T. C. F. Hill (86697), RAFVR.
J. L. Hillary (72676), RAFVR.
D. E. Hilliard (46746).
S. A. Hogg (89188), RAFVR.
J. R. C. Honeybone (107599), RAFVR
E. Hopcraft (86216), RAFVR.
H. J. Houghton, (45301).
L. F. Hubbard (46680).
T. F. Humphreys (81299), RAFVR.
S. J. Hunt (60213), RAFVR.
J. McA. Hutcheon (64786), RAFVR.
A. E. Jaquemet (87004), RAFVR.
C. R. Jeffries (87144), RAFVR.
D. L. Johnson, (88630), RAFVR.
G. A. B. Johnston (90596), Auxiliary Air Force.
C. M. Johnstone (86022), RAFVR.
R. I. Jones (77246), RAFVR.
W. F. Jordan (76529), RAFVR.
E. S. Kennedy (108023), RAFVR.
S. F. Kettell (45768).
D. V. Kidman (77749), RAFVR.
R. A. Kings (82953), RAFVR.
C. H. Kippen (77534), RAFVR.
T. G. Kirby-Green (39103), Reserve of Air Force Officers (deceased).
J. W. Knight (48164).
R. H. Knight, (49269), RAFVR.

W. D. W. Knight (100088), RAFVR.
V. D. Knox, (63842), RAFVR.
R. A. Kraty (106053), RAFVR.
R. W. Lass, (78834), RAFVR.
C. A. Lea (140775), RAFVR.
H. O. Leal (79930), RAFVR.
W. Lee (73784), RAFVR.
T. M. Leigh (65637), RAFVR.
N. L. Letten (42350).
E. M. Lewis, (103518).
E. T. Lewis (89537), RAFVR.
J. G. S. Linacre (112188), RAFVR.
J. D. K. Lloyd (77736), RAFVR.
T. W. Lloyd, (84133) (since deceased), RAFVR.
A. G. Logan (47611).
W. M. Lomax (75143), RAFVR.
F. B. Lowe (79470), RAFVR.
J. H. Lowes (43936).
M. J. Lucey (112348), RAFVR.
F. D. Lugard (73579), RAFVR.
H. S. Lusk (72539), RAFVR.
J. McA. McArthur (109157), RAFVR.
S. McAughey (85787), RAFVR.
C. A. McCaig (89277), RAFVR.
C. W. T. MacGillivray (74175), RAFVR.
A. J. McGregor (81919), RAFVR.
R. McLean (100720), RAFVR.
E. F. Macey (45497).
E. Maidment (44164).
J. D. Mallinson (42513).
J. K. Mallinson (105924), RAFVR.
E. W. J. Maloney (46158).
D. P. Marshall (107824), RAFVR.
H. L. Marshall (79274), RAFVR.
K. W. Marten (78799), RAFVR.
I. R. Mascall (72362), RAFVR.
H. G. Matheson (83917), RAFVR.
W. J. Mathews (73289), RAFVR.
E. V. F. Matthews (101205), RAFVR.
R. W. Mattocks (104805), RAFVR.
J. A. Meads (70810), Reserve of Air Force Officers.
F. Metcalfe (79956), RAFVR.
L. W. Meynell (65644), RAFVR.
D. H. Mills (87882), RAFVR.
L. H. Mills (114387), RAFVR.
T. W. H. Mills (100144), RAFVR.
R. Moore (65014), RAFVR.
A. W. I. Mosdell (45370).
J. E. Munden (45817).
D. Munro (68893), RAFVR.
W. A. Naylor (46288).
G. J. Newman (101037), RAFVR.
J. V. Newson (83309), RAFVR.
J. A. Nicholls (45396).
F. K. Nicholson (101415), RAFVR.
R. V. Nicholson (101186), RAFVR.
J. S. Nicoll (85173), RAFVR.
B. R. Noble (81043), RAFVR.
G. D. N. Noel-Johnson (42320).
L. C. Noon (46976).
S. Nunn (44480).
W. E. Ogle-Skan (41609), Reserve of Air Force Officers.
G. L. O'Hanlon,(44090).
J. H. Oughton (102586), RAFVR.
F. J. Pacey (106387), RAFVR.
T. H. Palmer (112857), RAFVR.
R. F. Paterson (83494), RAFVR.
S. E. Pattinson, (42429).
W. R. Peake, (45263).
G. E. R. Pearl (84303), RAFVR.
G. A. Pearson (46106).
J. M. Pearson (65593), RAFVR.
A. J. Peart (47625), RAFVR.
W. L. Peate (60360), RAFVR.
L. W. Percival,(46413).
D. G. Perry (45126).
G. G. Petty, (44357).
E. E. Philipp (78517), RAFVR.
S. F. Pickup (74203), RAFVR.
D. G. H. Pike (68183), RAFVR.
W. J. R. Pincott (86267), RAFVR.
T. H. Pollock (68716), RAFVR.
G. A. Potter (44251).
J. V. Powell (84423), RAFVR.
W. McQ. Pratt (44736).
F. L. Preston (62073), RAFVR.
C. Price (83818), RAFVR.
A. J. Putnam (115310), RAFVR.
J. R. F. Randell, (04184).
S. Rhodes (100797), RAFVR.
A. G. Rickard (45029).
R. Riley (85083), RAFVR.
J. B. Robinson (87786), RAFVR.
J. H. Robinson, (86429), RAFVR.
T. B. Robinson (104937), RAFVR.
F. A. Rood (46410).
W. V. Roe (61384), RAFVR.
A. A. Roissetter (46279).
C. A. B. Rome (78755), RAFVR.
S. N. Rose (81920), RAFVR.
K. A. Russell (112317), RAFVR.
R. W. Salmon (45170).
F. M. R. F. Sander (88922), RAFVR.
H. H. Sandiford (64401), RAFVR.
D. O. Sands, (102110), RAFVR.
A. E. Sansom (83815), RAFVR.
C. B. Savory (84942), RAFVR.
B. Schneider (87292), RAFVR.
R. H. Schofield (120349), RAFVR.
J. J. Secter (85773), RAFVR.
H. Seymour (83454), RAFVR.
H. J. C. Seymour (73787), RAFVR.
E. A. A. Shackleton (83143), RAFVR.
J. R. Sherborne (81835), RAFVR.
C. A. Shewell (89416), RAFVR.
N. P. Shields, (76450), RAFVR.
C. D. Short (74381), RAFVR.
E. H. Sillince (44885).
R. L. Simpson (81095), RAFVR.
J. S. Skelly (120172), RAFVR.
A. W. Slater (73399), RAFVR.
W. E. J. Smart (48268).
B. A. S. Smeed (45639).
J. M. Smiles (85613), RAFVR.
B. V. Smith (47246).
C. H. Smith (84233), RAFVR.
F. K. Smith (48979).
M. A. Smith, (88658), RAFVR.
P. N. Smith, (88026), RAFVR.
T. V. Smith (87493), RAFVR.
W. M. Smith (74229), RAFVR.
G. Smythe, (47752).
E. C. Spencer (63161), RAFVR.
R. J. Standing (43792).
R. Steele (62435), RAFVR.
R. A. Steele (100196), RAFVR.
F. S. Stewart (43923).
G. E. M. Stock (76274), RAFVR.
N. Storer (43758).
D. P. Story (61565), RAFVR.
E. H. G. Stringer, (102607), RAFVR.
F. H. Stubbs, (43480).
R. W. Sutton (44149).
S. L. Swain (75814), RAFVR.
T. H. Sykes (60715), RAFVR.
M. Tait (79010), RAFVR.
A. R. Tettenborn, (108048), RAFVR.
L. W. Thackwell (89980), RAFVR.
D. S. Thaw (85334), RAFVR.
F. A. Thompson (61079), RAFVR.
H. W. L. Thompson (85266), RAFVR.
R. C. A. Thompson (85154), RAFVR.
Sir Ivo W. H. Thomson (105268), RAFVR.
P. G. Todd, (79721), RAFVR.
R. F. L. Tong, (63848), RAFVR.
J. L. Trainer, (75984), RAFVR.
R. F. Trim (82664), RAFVR.
H. R. Tucker (44437).
G. F. Turner (77588), RAFVR.
K. R. Upright (85907), RAFVR.
J. Walmisley (80055), RAFVR.
L. W. N. Walker (45864).
A. F. Ward (45472).
H. J. Walters (100612), RAFVR.
A. F. Wearn (44161).
A. C. G. Wenman (85270), RAFVR.
L. E. West (86048), RAFVR.
L. B. White (89407), RAFVR.
A. Whitehead (84438), RAFVR.
E. Whitehead (83908), RAFVR.
S. R. Whiting (87443), RAFVR.
A. E. B. Williams (102962), RAFVR.
B. H. Williams, (68820), RAFVR.
J. Williams (82236), RAFVR.
J. E. A. Williams, (40652), Reserve of Air Force Officers (deceased).
F. L. Wills (75036), RAFVR.
J. Wilson (70883), Reserve of Air Force Officers.
F. W. Winstanley (116000), RAFVR.
A. J. Winyard (134302), RAFVR.
G. Wright (42780), Reserve of Air Force Officers.
L. T. Wright (45287).
R. E. Young (60504), RAFVR.

Flight Lieutenants

A. E. C. Agate, (89642), RAFVR.
H. V. Alexander (117438), RAFVR.
R. N. G. Allen, (63484), RAFVR.
D. M. Anderson (60302), RAFVR.
M. W. Arthurton, (120253), RAFVR.
K. R. Ash (69358), RAFVR.
H. L. Ashman (106567), RAFVR.
D. J. Aslin (102097), RAFVR.
G. B. Atkinson (77618), RAFVR.
K. L. Barber (79451), RAFVR.
A. Barker (109499), RAFVR.
W. T. Barnicot (60627), RAFVR.
E. Batchelor (100586), RAFVR.
P. H. Beake (84923), RAFVR.
J. A. Beare, Reserve of Air Force Officers.
W. McB. G. Beaton (46859).
F. Bennett (121916), RAFVR.
M. R. Besley (115616), RAFVR.
A. E. Bibb (44854).
R. H. Blackmore (111098), RAFVR.
T. V. G. Blanks (106144), RAFVR.
W. E. Bloomfield (45363).
G. Bosomworth (140136), RAFVR.
C. N. H. Bowdler (89444), RAFVR.
J. E. Boyd (116385), RAFVR.
R. E. Brandon, (134287), RAFVR.
E. G. Brettell, (61053), RAFVR (deceased).
E. Brewer (73856), RAFVR.
W. C. Brodie (49225).
F. H. Buckley (46364).
L. G. Bull, (43932) (deceased).
S. G. Burdick (86211), RAFVR.
H. A. Byford (149858), RAFVR.
A. R. Cadman (45207).
A. E. Caen (74069), RAFVR.
C. Campbell (84879), RAFVR.
A. R. Carfrae (83915), RAFVR.
G. M. Carter (80946), RAFVR.
M. J. Casey (39024), Reserve of Air Force Officers (deceased).
A. A. Castle (108153), RAFVR.
R. B. Cawood (87231), RAFVR.
R. C. Chamberlain (109685), RAFVR.
K. A. Charlton (102122), RAFVR.
J. Clayton (115635), RAFVR.
J. H. Coller, (115590), RAFVR.
A. H. Comfort (61981), RAFVR.
C. P. C. Cook (103264), RAFVR.
A. H. L. Cooper (87766), RAFVR.
F. C. Cooper (86080), RAFVR.
C. W. Corless (44H7).
W. I. Covington, (119537), RAFVR.
J. Cummings (79877), RAFVR.
J. R. Cuthbertson (102256), RAFVR.
H. L. Dale (49017).
N. F. W. H. D'Arcy (82029), RAFVR.
F. J. Dempsey (118546), RAFVR.
T. E. Dixon (104673), RAFVR.
I. Donald, (121388), RAFVR.
I. A. F. Donnelly (78946), RAFVR.
I. F. Easton (49430).
L. R. Edwards (61198), RAFVR.
R. H. Edwards (42113) (deceased).
H. M. Elliott (88124), RAFVR.
W. B. Ellis (102963), RAFVR.
C. G. Endersby (109366), RAFVR.
N. G. Errington (115638), RAFVR.
W. D. C. Erskine-Crum (63421), RAFVR.
A. L. L. Evans (87722), RAFVR.
B. H. Evans (42745), Reserve of Air Force Officers (deceased).
E. Evans (61615), RAFVR.
H. D. Evans (105231), RAFVR.
H. Fallows (46002).
R. Fearon (88801), RAFVR.
E. R. S. Fendick (45972)
F. H. Finnis (115733), RAFVR.
J. R. Fitzmaurice (46041).
J. C. Ford (43677).
D. R. Forssander (101783), RAFVR.
N. J. Freeman (62685), RAFVR.
A. A. Frisby (88596), RAFVR.
T. F. Frost (44451).
W. J. Gardner (44552).
F. J. Garwood (44477).
I. D. Gebbie, (112464), RAFVR.
R. I. Gray (45910).
W. P. Gregg (79671), RAFVR.
D. J. A. Griffiths (131685), RAFVR.
H. Griffiths (46356).
W. J. Grisman (45148) (deceased).
F. Grossman (88841), RAFVR.
A. D. M. Gunn (60340), RAFVR (deceased).
C. P. Hall (50896), RAFVR (deceased).
S. A. Hankey (60422), RAFVR (deceased).
A. G. Hardy, (137263), RAFVR.
D. G. Harley, (132251), RAFVR.
J. Harris (47333).
W. C. Hart (78008), RAFVR.
G. Hastie (74819), RAFVR.
A. R. H. Hayter (42124), Reserve of Air Force Officers (deceased).
W. J. Hayward (110916), RAFVR.
M. Hecht (129171), RAFVR.
F. Herbert, Reserve of Air Force Officers.
R. T. Hodges, (103016), RAFVR.
A. C. W. Holland (83245), RAFVR.
P. H. E. Hope-Ross (60400), RAFVR.
A. F. Howgate (82768), RAFVR.
R. V. Hughes (104472), RAFVR.
E. S. Humphreys (44177) (deceased).
E. L. Iliffe (81270), RAFVR.
W. M. Jack (76190), RAFVR.
A. James (43203).
A. I. James (60307), RAFVR.
R. G. James (106586), RAFVR.
E. Johns,(46470).
W. D. Johnston (86021), RAFVR.
B. Jones (60326), RAFVR.
R. W. Keates (117635), RAFVR.
H. Keeling (113956), RAFVR.
H. H. Keen (82861), RAFVR.
R. S. Kemp-Scriven (90850), Auxiliary Air Force.
F. A. Kenney (46060).
W. C. Ker (80146), RAFVR.
F. Kerr (84412), RAFVR.
W. J. W. Kettlewell (90942).
R. S. Kingsford (102557), RAFVR.
J. E. Kirkness (115279), RAFVR.

H. C. Kirsopp (86463), RAFVR.
W. R. A. Knocker (74333), RAFVR.
R. T. Knowles (101174), RAFVR.
P. J. Kydd (82745), RAFVR.
A. G. Lacy (108040), RAFVR.
S. W. Landau (111951), RAFVR.
G. J. Lane (116687), RAFVR.
A. G. Lang (65954), RAFVR.
A. R. Laughland, (44528).
R. Leggett (103037), RAFVR.
A. W. G. Le Hardy (132181), RAFVR.
T. B. Leigh (46462) (deceased).
G. V. F. Lloyd (115835), RAFVR.
A. M. Lewis (132371), RAFVR.
E. H. Lewis (121106), RAFVR.
D. R. Lishman (81207), RAFVR.
B. A. Lock (115808), RAFVR.
J. K. McCabe, (101824), RAFVR.
J. Macfarlane (89017), RAFVR.
K. McI. Mackenzie (126474), RAFVR.
R. McKimm, (109137), RAFVR.
A. Macmillan (100461), RAFVR.
K. G. Macmillan (73285), RAFVR.
A. M. A. Majendie (60542), RAFVR.
B. V. Manders (43930).
R. P. Manning (48798).
J. W. Martin (128020), RAFVR.
G. I. Mason (44965).
R. H. Matthews (60788), RAFVR.
T. W. Matthews (108052), RAFVR (deceased).
J. Maund (50743).
C. H. Mears (84625), RAFVR.
A. A. Mellor (86666), RAFVR.
H. J. Milford (103586), RAFVR (deceased).
A. Millar (114578), RAFVR.
G. C. Millichamp (81582), RAFVR.
J. H. Milne (119356), RAFVR.
J. W. Minors (46753).
W. C. C. Morgan (49210).
G. J. P. Morhen (113485), RAFVR.
R. Mortimer, (116009), RAFVR.
F. J. A. Mott (61173), RAFVR.
R. W. L. Mulliner (115654), RAFVR.
G. J. N. Neal (105324), RAFVR.
D. Newton (83377), RAFVR.
A. C. Nisbet (46265).
H. A. M. Norton (84830), RAFVR.
E. C. Ormonde (75643), RAFVR.
W. J. A. Osburn (77642), RAFVR.
A. Pedley (48328).
A. G. Pell (44390).
C. M. Pell (103292), RAFVR.
A. L. Pemberton (86948), RAFVR.
K. W. Pendrey (49145).
G. E. Phillips, (118940), RAFVR.
R. K. Phillips, (129257), RAFVR.
C. A. Pilgrim (46869).
N. V. Pinder, (100491), RAFVR.
W. H. Pinfold (102612), RAFVR.
A. M. Pollitt (45604).
J. L. Powell (103039), RAFVR.
Y. L. Rabin (110263), RAFVR.
W. B. Rawling (88294), RAFVR.
S. P. St. C. Raymond (79120), RAFVR.
R. W. Read (61278), RAFVR.
T. Rimmer (103528), RAFVR.
A. B. Rivlin (65955), RAFVR.
D. G. Robinson (72928), RAFVR.
D. H. Rowlands, (122998), RAFVR.
A. W. Ruffhead (89397), RAFVR.
W. K. Sankey (62117), RAFVR.
E. T. Sargent, Reserve of Air Force Officers.
W. E. Saunders (140218), RAFVR.
F. Sharpe (83645), RAFVR.
A. K. Sherwood (118687), RAFVR.
J. D. Simmonds (131920), RAFVR.
Le R. A. Skinner (101460), RAFVR.
R. D. Skyrme (119310), RAFVR.
L. Slack (121097), RAFVR.
P. Sleight (114942), RAFVR.
A. D. Smith (111962), RAFVR.
C. W. Smith (102662), RAFVR.
G. F. Smith (66547), RAFVR.
W. Snowden (45611).
G. Steel (84348), RAFVR.
D. H. Steele (101420), RAFVR.
A. L. Stevens (115546), RAFVR.
K. Stevens (89333), RAFVR.
W. J. Stevens (119009), RAFVR.
I. G. Stewart (44541).
I. P. Stewart (102575), RAFVR.
J. G. Stower (107520), RAFVR (deceased).
D. O. Street (123026), RAFVR (deceased).
L. C. Sutton (83001), RAFVR.
C. S. N. Swan (108950), RAFVR.
C. D. Swain (37658), Reserve of Air Force Officers (deceased).
R. M. Talbot (63794), RAFVR.
J. S. Tannahill (63847), RAFVR.
E. A. Taylor (105159), RAFVR.
W. E. F. Teague (107812), RAFVR.
A. F. Thompson (47724).
P. D. Thompson, (84697), RAFVR.
C. F. Tomkins (68099), RAFVR.
R. O. Trapp (121413), RAFVR.
C. E. Trippe (77426), RAFVR.
L. G. Turner (113837), RAFVR.
E. H. Tyson (79610), RAFVR.
G. L. Usher (88251), RAFVR.
L. C. Velluet (108537), RAFVR.
G. W. Walenn (73022), RAFVR (deceased).
D. E. Walker (60574), RAFVR.
L. F. P. Walters (83904), RAFVR.
E. C. S. Weale (77760), RAFVR.
N. R. C. White (103033), RAFVR.
C. J. Williams (44620).
J. F. Williams (106173), RAFVR (deceased).
M. Williamson, (106108), RAFVR.
K. B. Willis (85844), RAFVR.
A. F. Wills (83834), RAFVR.
A. Wilson (44729).
H. E. Wood, (87364), RAFVR.
L. F. S. Wootton (46561).
P. J. Wylie (83614), RAFVR.
J. C. Yorke (132330), RAFVR.
W. H. Youdale (88798), RAFVR.
F. H. Zeigler (89427), RAFVR.

Acting Flight Lieutenants

A. V. Albertini (119844), RAFVR.
F. W. Alderson (123573), RAFVR.
H. E. Alexander (48539).
C. Allison (101613), RAFVR.
A. S. Allwood (135946), RAFVR.
E. W. Amos (126561), RAFVR.
W. E. Arnell (114669), RAFVR.
T. W. Atkinson (123824), RAFVR.
W. J. G. Attewell (110968), RAFVR.
D. W. Attwood (135479), RAFVR.
G. S. Baker (66611), RAFVR.
R. J. K. Baker (47865), RAFVR.
W. J. Bannon (63959), RAFVR.
B. K. Barber (122391), RAFVR.
G. C. Barnes (114144), RAFVR.
P. W. Barnes (109410), RAFVR.
N. Barratt (100214), RAFVR.
A. S. Bartlett (133314), RAFVR.
N. Beaumont (46284).
H. H. Beck (49859).
F. G. T. Belcham (105862), RAFVR.
E. F. Belcher (133562), RAFVR.
W. H. G. Bench (48432).
E. N. Beswick (47924).
D. T. Biddle (110869), RAFVR.
G. W. Birch (102224), RAFVR.
E. S. Bird (103651), RAFVR.
J. T. Blackball (100749), RAFVR.
S. Blumenthal (87299), RAFVR.
C. N. Bond (67781), RAFVR.
R. Bottomley (113074), RAFVR.
S. D. Bowler (101592), RAFVR.
J. M. Boyd (118934), RAFVR.
G. C. L. Brigham (60890), RAFVR.
D. J. Bright (48012), RAFVR.
C. A. Brown (49957).
S. C. Brown (103669), RAFVR.
W. C. Brown (47880).
S. F. Brownless (144886), RAFVR.
A. H. C. Bruce (82235), RAFVR.
E. W. Buckler (106780), RAFVR.
J. Bunting (49793).
W. Burns (108252), RAFVR.
R. W. B. Burton (63926), RAFVR.
E. J. Cane (134268), RAFVR.
E. J. Carroll (63929), RAFVR.
M. Carty (109609), RAFVR.
P. Cassidy (109611), RAFVR.
A. E. H. Cattle (117960), RAFVR.
F. E. Chapman (109171), RAFVR.
J. K. Cheatle (112064), RAFVR.
E. W. Chown (105338), RAFVR.
D. N. Clark (48513).
W. E. Clarke (135007), RAFVR.
J. Clement (51187).
J. H. Clement (126017), RAFVR.
J. R. Coates (143929), RAFVR.
A. Cockman (106198), RAFVR.
E. W. Coleman (107569), RAFVR.
G. C. Colley (139741), RAFVR.
S. C. Collins (61098), RAFVR.
P. E. Colman (50163).
G. C. Constable (107733), RAFVR.
D. W. Copley (112081), RAFVR.
H. Cossar, (46173).
T. A. D. Crook (102306), RAFVR.
F. S. Cunningham, (106803), RAFVR.
D. A. Curran (124739), RAFVR.
H. C. W. Dally (106933), RAFVR.
S. C. Davey (69573), RAFVR.
C. Davies (121485), RAFVR.
J. P. De Pledge (108690), RAFVR.
H. Diack (136567), RAFVR.
W. Dickson (48236).
A. H. Draper, (42967).
M. Driscoll (49166).
P. H. E. Dunn (109738), RAFVR.
G. G. Dusgate (114257), RAFVR.
L. T. Eaglesfield (125911), RAFVR.
J. E. Easthope (86069), RAFVR.
H. T. Edwards (60388), RAFVR.
F. C. Eldridge (117525), RAFVR.
F. X. Erdozain (105230), RAFVR.
D. Evans (137330), RAFVR.
H. B. C. Evans (117574), RAFVR.
F. Fallon (49433).
D. M. Farquharson (81121), RAFVR.
D. G. Farrow (106425), RAFVR.
H. Finch (146174), RAFVR.
H. Foster (50292).
R. O. Foster (119430), RAFVR.
W. E. Fowles (131203), RAFVR.
A. W. Fraser (102781), RAFVR.
A. V. Fry, (122993), RAFVR.
A. J. P. Furneaux (118821), RAFVR.
R. Gale (121481), RAFVR.
F. J. Gibney,(118086), RAFVR.
A. Gillespie (107445), RAFVR.
S. A. Godrich (112122), RAFVR.
J. S. Gowland (120321), RAFVR.
C. F. Graham (134745), RAFVR.
H. Green (50908).
B. F. Greig (104151), RAFVR.
A. M. Gunn (111814), RAFVR.
F. A. Haden (133995), RAFVR.
A. K. Halsey (120961), RAFVR.
W. J. Harris (125554), RAFVR.
W. C. E. Hartley (107595), RAFVR.
L. G. Harwood (117815), RAFVR.
E. J. Haslam (50918).
J. L. Hawley (109629), RAFVR.
R. H. Hayhoe (103327), RAFVR.
R. C. Hayman (68244), RAFVR.
C. O. Heron (112882), RAFVR.
W. W. Hewitt (139258), RAFVR.
A. F. Hill (123999), RAFVR.
F. T. Hill (108710), RAFVR.
B. P. Hodges (103328), RAFVR.
R. B. Hodgkinson (62063), RAFVR.
R. T. Holland, (48842).
B. E. Hooke (133542), RAFVR.
A. Holt (105778), RAFVR.
V. Hughes (125761), RAFVR.
J. B. Hunter (63996), RAFVR.
C. W. Jackson (110919), RAFVR.
G. H. Jacobsen, (51075).
J. F. R. Jones (128559), RAFVR.
R. J. Jones, (47775).
W. E. Jones (123072), RAFVR.
B. B. Joseph (62478), RAFVR.
H. L. Karby (111746), RAFVR.
H. Keenan (125893), RAFVR.
J. P. Kennedy (123480), RAFVR.
A. E. Kent (113561), RAFVR.
W. J. Kerby (117219), RAFVR.
D. R. S. Kyd (105502), RAFVR.

R. C. Lambert (50875).
H. Lewis (130851), RAFVR.
G. F. Lindsay (115289), RAFVR.
W. G. Ling (49245).
D. Livingstone (47612).
G. J. Lloyd (101742), RAFVR.
R. W. Lloyd (135146), RAFVR.
C. G. Loader (51268).
H. R. Locke (101687), RAFVR.
G. S. Lodge (136944), RAFVR.
Y. R. W. Lovegrove (47640).
M. W. Lowry (107620), RAFVR.
H. G. Loxdale (121034), RAFVR.
G. McCallum (111207), RAFVR.
G. E. McCullagh (48288).
A. MacDonald (117482), RAFVR.
J. B. Mahoney (51764).
P. Maloney, (136723), RAFVR.
M. le M. Hanson (120241), RAFVR.
R. W. Manuel (133030), RAFVR.
G. E. Marx (66097), RAFVR.
J. Matthews (123211), RAFVR.
D. Merrett (50091).
K. V. Miles (51466).
W. D. Miller (114918), RAFVR.
J. Misell (131717), RAFVR.
H. E. Morris (87733), RAFVR.
D. W. Munson (133835), RAFVR.
T. L. Murray (112269), RAFVR.
J. W. Naylor (51571).
W. G. Neal (141863), RAFVR.
J. B. Nelson (107426), RAFVR.
F. W. Orchard (107808), RAFVR.
T. N. F. Orr (106832) RAFVR.
N. E. Page (130043), RAFVR.
A. F. Pape (113582), RAFVR.
D. Parker (125342), RAFVR.
J. C. Parry-Jones (48686).
I. V. Paterson (102763), RAFVR.
E. Patterson (103920), RAFVR.
B. H. Pattinson (121820), RAFVR.
J. G. Pearse (126525), RAFVR.
H. T. Petts, (157326), RAFVR.
G. J. Pester (117189), RAFVR.
G. S. Phillips (102721), RAFVR.
J. T. Pike (50393).
M. H. Pocock (124960), RAFVR.
G. A. Podevin (60460), RAFVR.
A. J. L. Pollen (109650), RAFVR.
S. W. P. Pooles (104936), RAFVR.
T. P. Postlethwaite (109090), RAFVR.
C. H. Prestage (111167), RAFVR.
C. N. S. Pringle (63127), RAFVR.
J. R. Pritchard (52332).
T. A. M. Pritchard (46278).
J. Purcell, (127483), RAFVR.
T. G. Rankin (62131), RAFVR.
C. S. Reade (31461), Reserve of Air Force Officers.
I. J. Richards (47946).
H. Richardson (61849), RAFVR.
E. G. O. Ridgwell (104818), RAFVR.
C. W. Ringrose (108972), RAFVR.
S. W. L. Ripley (117540).
F. C. Rodwell (111012), RAFVR.
C. Rogers (123547), RAFVR.
J. Rogers (126003), RAFVR.
W. J. Rogers (66641), RAFVR.
L. R. N. F. J. Roig (112385), RAFVR.
H. G. Rowe (48344).
J. Russell (131680), RAFVR.
L. T. Rye (91011), Auxiliary Air Force.
T. W. Savage (105167), RAFVR (deceased).
D. Scott (106401), RAFVR.
H. J. Scott-Browne (45519).
E. W. Seabourne, (105162), RAFVR.
D. H. Semmence (49002).
E. J. Sharpe (128384), RAFVR.
R. Simpson (112248), RAFVR.
C. A. Sirett (48359).
G. C. Skeates (103994), RAFVR.
G. H. Smith (139269), RAFVR.
S. M. Smith (63998), RAFVR.
G. Spedding, (127058), RAFVR.
A. L. Spiller (62470), RAFVR.
G. B. Spiller (113015), RAFVR.
S. R. Stanbridge (134653), RAFVR.
G. W. Staples (51101).
R. Stephenson (112841), RAFVR.
J. E. Stevens (46674).
W. Stirling (115898), RAFVR.
F. Stocks (49715), RAFVR.
L. H. Stowell (106405), RAFVR.
W. R. Suter (46862).
S. A. Sutton (109091), RAFVR.
W. Sykes (49411).
W. L. Tait (134455), RAFVR.
A. C. Tapsell (101487), RAFVR.
C. Taylor (110013), RAFVR.
W. R. Thompson (134512.), RAFVR.
H. L. Thorne (121518), RAFVR.
J. M. Tighe (141022), RAFVR.
J. Tocher (50549).
T. E. Trafford (110280), RAFVR.
J. D. Twidale (119934), RAFVR.
J. W. J. Underell (131666), RAFVR.
E. A. Vale (52691).
J. F. Viveash (47977).
D. C. F. Waller (107287), RAFVR.
J. E. Walton (106087), RAFVR.
J. Ward (115923), RAFVR.
J. Ward (120493), RAFVR.
S. A. Warren (50420).
G. Watson, (134317), RAFVR.
G. C. Watkins (144842), RAFVR.
V. E. M. Watkins, (48257).
O. Watson (49465).
N. W. Weblin (67746), RAFVR.
L. Wells (50211).
T. E. Whiting (107493), RAFVR.
E. G. Wicks (111959), RAFVR.
C. H. Wiggins (105363), RAFVR.
A. E. C. Wilkie (49687), RAFVR.
R. E. Wilkinson, (124557), RAFVR.
H. C. L. Williams (103226), RAFVR.
L. H. Williams (48725).
G. C. S. Willis (112271), RAFVR.
A. A. Wilshaw (110288), RAFVR.
F. B. R. Wilson (130809), RAFVR.
S. S. Wilson (105219), RAFVR.
H. G. Wood (130029), RAFVR.
E. E. Wollen (62128), RAFVR.
G. A. Wright (114109), RAFVR.
R. D. Yandell (51254).
C. H. Young (114111), RAFVR.
R. Young (49132).
J. H. Younger (112745), RAFVR.

Flying Officers

V. Adams (159892), RAFVR.
D. S. Adshead (52799).
R. W. Alford (168697), RAFVR.
C. V. Allen (159887), RAFVR.
J. C. Allison (124217), RAFVR.
J. D. Anderson (129690), RAFVR.
J. S. Angus (138936), RAFVR.
R. V. B. Arnaboldi (117298), RAFVR.
A. R. Ashby (147063), RAFVR.
W. H. Avery (107724), RAFVR.
E. L. Baines (50389).
R. A. Baker, (143896), RAFVR.
W. Bagnall (142480), RAFVR.
M. Barker (128444), RAFVR.
R. E. Barckley (138650), RAFVR.
G. J. L. Bate (145300), RAFVR.
T. S. Beckett (50200).
W. H. Bell (137178), RAFVR.
C. H. Bennett (108893), RAFVR.
G. C. Berriman (131724), RAFVR.
K. R. Blackhurst (142498), RAFVR.
C. F. Bland (126009), RAFVR.
A. M. Boyce (136592.), RAFVR.
R. W. Boxall, (85306), RAFVR.
W. A. T. Brewer (147505), RAFVR.
H. G. Briggs (48931).
N. V. Bristow (124117), RAFVR.
L. C. Brown (147136), RAFVR.
R. S. N. Brown (143238), RAFVR.
D. Cameron, (146616), RAFVR.
N. C. Carey (51596).
J. Carmichael (64992), RAFVR.
D. H. Chapman (135257), RAFVR.
F. Chapman (128429), RAFVR.
R. G. Charlton (139793), RAFVR.
A. E. Claridge (130753), RAFVR.
A. Clark, (147233), RAFVR.
J. N. Clarke (51188).
D. B. Clemow (113795), RAFVR.
D. H. Cochran (122441), RAFVR (deceased).
L. Coen (149463), RAFVR.
H. L. C. Cole (136635), RAFVR.
J. H. Cole, (159889), RAFVR.
A. A. G. Combes (148124), RAFVR.
F. Cooling (137740), RAFVR.
K. R. Cooper (50076).
J. A. Coyne (53136).
S. Cracknell (105877), RAFVR.
P. J. Crowley (49806).
A. S. E. Dale (120698), RAFVR.
D. J. Davies (148406), RAFVR.
I. S. Davies (143093), RAFVR.
P. R. Davies (143583), RAFVR.
J. Davy (141948), RAFVR.
K. J. Day (139067), RAFVR.
R. B. Deans (136628), RAFVR.
M. B. Denning (121618), RAFVR.
R. J. Dennis (125867), RAFVR.
A. E. Dishington (159935), RAFVR.
W. G. Doddington, (52162).
J. H. E. Duke (124278), RAFVR.
R. H. Dunn (138316), RAFVR.
J. B. Eatock, (149080), RAFVR.
J. Edwards, (159695), RAFVR.
R. W. Edwards (157634), RAFVR.
P. J. Eldred (117133), (deceased), RAFVR.
H. T. Ellis (108697), RAFVR.
H. N. Evans (142490), RAFVR.
J. A. P. Evans (138949), RAFVR.
N. T. Fairfax (129938), RAFVR.
J. W. Fathers (148201), RAFVR.
L. Faulkes (148657), RAFVR.
G. D. Felix (108358), RAFVR.
M. Finlayson (140159), RAFVR.
G. E. Fitt (160533), RAFVR.
A. E. Fort (47757).
W. H. Francis (132367), RAFVR.
F. G. Freake (123519), RAFVR.
E. H. Frost (146644), RAFVR.
H. St. J. Garland (136344), RAFVR.
G. L. Garnham (143240), RAFVR.
W. H. Garratt, (60393), RAFVR.
W. C. Garrett-Petts (27084).
J. Gibson (149470), RAFVR.
F. Glen (142567), RAFVR.
J. P. F. Goodchild (109900), RAFVR.
H. D. Goossens (106630), RAFVR.
A. Gould (48473).
R. Gould (142614), RAFVR.
R. E. Gould (139796), RAFVR.
C. E. M. Graham (159937), RAFVR.
J. S. Grant (109210), RAFVR.
A. C. Graves (125514), RAFVR.
C. C. Grebby (133289), RAFVR.
R. V. Green (123436), RAFVR.
D. G. Greville (143449), RAFVR.
S. H. Guy (159895), RAFVR.
H. D. Ham (126243), RAFVR (deceased).
P. L. Hanan (51358).
T. W. Harper (49188).
G. F. Haselock (146619), RAFVR.
F. R. Hatley (143400), RAFVR.
G. Hawes (109628), RAFVR.
D. H. Hawkins (158602), RAFVR.
A. E. Hayward (156446), RAFVR.
J. A. Keeps (109226), RAFVR.
R. W. Hegan (129517), RAFVR.
A. A. Henry (131970), RAFVR.
A. M. L. Herreman (146066), RAFVR.
F. L. Hewish (129480), RAFVR.
H. L. Hewitt (127261), RAFVR.
F. Hill (131484), RAFVR.
W. Hill (147883), RAFVR.
P. F. Hoare (123493), RAFVR.
M. M. Holmes (103191), RAFVR.

A. F. Huggett (134617), RAFVR.
A. H. W. Hurn (48707).
C. B. Hurrie (133068), RAFVR.
E. Ingram (135962), RAFVR.
N. Jackson (136015), RAFVR.
J. T. James (149602), RAFVR.
N. Jeffreys (51318).
P. L. Kelly, (51110), RAFVR.
H. A. Kepp-Page (136976), RAFVR.
D. S. Kerr (129470), RAFVR.
R. M. Kethro (156044), RAFVR.
W. H. Kilby (145739), RAFVR.
D. A. Lafbery (142215), RAFVR.
C. D. Landeau (112.331), RAFVR.
H. Langford (50603).
L. V. Lawrence (137734), RAFVR.
T. W. Ledingham (149340), RAFVR.
J. Leitch (104600), RAFVR.
R. F. Lewis (159933), RAFVR.
W. R. McK. Lindsay (116434), RAFVR.
A. F. Little (130765), RAFVR.
J. Long (140252), RAFVR.
J. McA. McBride (113888), RAFVR (deceased).
P. K. McGurk (53345).
H. H. McKay (140763), RAFVR.
A. D. McLachlan (145178), RAFVR.
R. G. Magner (139501), RAFVR.
R. F. Marrack (139943), RAFVR.
S. Marsh (159890), RAFVR.
D. C. Martin (52312).
W. B. Mathias (132878), RAFVR.
A. H. Melluish (156041), RAFVR.
R. G. McG. Melvin (132454), RAFVR.
J. E. Misseldine (134227), RAFVR.
E. G. Morgan (121846), RAFVR.
R. M. Nash (147700), RAFVR.
D. K. Nelson (157484), RAFVR.
K. Newby (147920), RAFVR.
H. W. A. Newman (49385).
J. K. Newman (49873).
F. R. Nicholls (130350), RAFVR.
G. A. Nunn (146150), RAFVR.
F. M. B. O'Connell (106900), RAFVR.
H. L. O'Sullivan (101701), RAFVR.
W. D. Paddy (56446).
E. Parsons (128825), RAFVR.
H. A. Penny (139204), RAFVR.
H. W. Phillips (143912), RAFVR.
C. W. W. Powell (137019), RAFVR.
J. A. C. Prescott (138567), RAFVR.
J. Prideaux (111757), RAFVR.
J. Quinn (148704), RAFVR.
W. S. O. Randle (144393), RAFVR.
N. G. Reading (121224), RAFVR.
A. P. Reen, (49996).
S. A. Rees (123550), RAFVR.
G. C. Richardson (143372), RAFVR.
C. G. H. Ricketts (135952), RAFVR.
F. W. Roberts (134271), RAFVR.
G. W. Roberts (52310).
J. Robertson (142232), RAFVR.
J. S. Robson (138664), RAFVR.
J. H. N. Rogers (105582), RAFVR.
J. A. Rowan-Parry (80442), RAFVR.
S. Salt (112239), RAFVR.
A. K. Sandifer (156361), RAFVR.
G. W. Schoon, (141463), RAFVR.
C. B. S. Seaman (155951), RAFVR.
G. Self (156420), RAFVR.
M. D. Senator (130828), RAFVR.
H. Settle (134277), RAFVR.
J. D. Shanahan (117554), RAFVR.
W. J. Simpson (103217), RAFVR.
S. H. Siviter (131665), RAFVR.
R. Skinner (145335), RAFVR.
C. F. Sloper (51407).
S. O. Smaliman (160079), RAFVR.
C. S. Smith (149956), RAFVR.
D. N. Smith, (135269), RAFVR.
E. F. Smith (1352.59), RAFVR.
A. W. P. Spears (50686).
W. J. W. Squires (136561), RAFVR.
B. F. P. Start (110271), RAFVR.
F. M. Startup (50352).
S. P. Steavenson (132468), RAFVR.
R. C. Stewart (130452), RAFVR (deceased).
F. R. Stone (160519), RAFVR.
J. P. Studer (144319), RAFVR.
R. Sutton (145304), RAFVR.
J. W. Tattersall (156115), RAFVR.
J. Taylor (51141).
T. C. Taylor (160620), RAFVR.
G. A. Terry (132857), RAFVR.
D. I. Thomas (141183), RAFVR.
V. F. J. Torrisi (125166), RAFVR.
G. E. V. Townsend (146292), RAFVR.
F. J. G. Trim (50311).
F. A. Tuck (148831), RAFVR.
A. E. Y. Tulip (148241), RAFVR.
G. U. Vero (51606).
A. G. W. Wade (143660), RAFVR.
R. Wane, (113255), RAFVR.
G. Ware, (140918), RAFVR.
G. W. H. Ware (53829).
D. A. Webb (119890), RAFVR.
T. M. Welch (133266), RAFVR.
H. J. Wellard, (143785), RAFVR.
D. J. White (140049), RAFVR.
K. E. N. Whitehall (125555), RAFVR.
G. Whittle (61548), RAFVR.
A. S. Williams (139674), RAFVR.
J. G. Williams (136746), RAFVR.
S. C. A. Wilson (149445), RAFVR.
R. S. Wood (138278), RAFVR.
E. G. Wray (49718).

Pilot Officers

H. C. Ammett (162871), RAFVR.
A. E. Ballard (144572), RAFVR.
E. Barnett (53823).
A. J. Barson (54177).
J. Black (172810), RAFVR.
E. Blanchard (160859), RAFVR.
D. T. Bone, (171664), RAFVR.
T. G. Buckley (170664), RAFVR.
A. Conway (171793), RAFVR.
J. A. Dellow (171266), RAFVR.
L. W. Drake (148961), RAFVR.
A. E. Evans (54289), RAFVR.
F. Fairchild (53429).
E. G. Fisher (53718).
D. Grant (171708), RAFVR.
W. Harris (50504).
T. J. Hedley (149480), RAFVR.
G. R. Herbert (142149), RAFVR (deceased).
D. L. Hindle (169654), RAFVR.

F. Jackson (171791), RAFVR.
S. Jeapes (170687), RAFVR.
E. F. J. King (171786), RAFVR.
E. O. Mackay (162586), RAFVR.
R. J. A. Macleod (155116), RAFVR.
F. Melling (53554).
A. H. Mogridge (162830), RAFVR.
J. J. Nelson (171920), RAFVR.
D. E. Owen (172553), RAFVR.
M. Pearce (161468), RAFVR.
T. M. Robinson (84938), RAFVR (deceased).
M. J. Smith (172723), RAFVR.
J. Stead (160951), RAFVR.
G. Sutherland (172983), RAFVR.
R. J. Talbot (161698), RAFVR.
J. C. Thomson (171693), RAFVR.
W. D. Tildsley (160627), RAFVR.
J. W. Watkins (168633), RAFVR.
R. C. Webster (173076), RAFVR.

Acting Pilot Officer
T. C. Coombs (53710).

Warrant Officers

L. C. Adams (366202).
J. I. Addison (513399)
B. D. Allen (157641).
J. Ashmore (564323).
J. Atkin (329077).
W. R. Austin (561024).
L. J. Bamber (350928).
P. E. Bearne (363802).
G. A. Bennett (538256).
J. D. Berryman (590605).
V. K. Blackley (365225).
P. G. C. Blunden (355756).
D. Binns (635063).
G. Biswell (356065).
J. R. Bolton (562446).
W. T. Bond (361669).
S. Booth (590261).
W. V. Bowen (525280).
R. J. Bradley (515336).
A. H. Brinsley (511440).
W. A. Broomfield, (866431), Auxiliary Air Force.
A. E. Bull (560038).
F. H. Burgess (590659).
E. Cartwright (349146).
K. F. Charlesworth (370810).
G. A. Clark (590914).
M. E. W. Clarke (513073).
T. C. Clarkson (356300).
C. E. A. Colder (248819).
A. P. Coleman (507068).
R. S. Connell (403721).
B. C. Cooper (366070).
T. A. Corteen (349476).
H. W. Crocker (514646).
H. Dann (511707).
E. G. Darlington (366262).
T. Darlington (529693).
F. Davies (347610).
R. H. Davis (564623).
A. E. Day (564152).
G. W. Ditchburn (521976).
R. S. Dodds (511117).
W. W. Dougan. (567164).
J. S. Dugan (362904).
M. E. Dunford (365258).
F. Eatherly (352066).
A. Edmead (354886).
L. H. Empson (1261126), RAFVR.
W. H. Edinburgh (1379496), RAFVR.
J. Emmins (353340).
F. G. Fennel (155492).
W. C. Fenwick (370345).
J. D. Fish (1376458), RAFVR.
H. Freeth (301968).
N. A. H. Garnham (907627), RAFVR.
I. H. de H. Gibbon (365859).
W. C. Gloyn (363974).
W. G. Goodyer (513121).
A. Gosney (244398).
T. Grainger (347250).
J. H. Gray (335147)
R. G. Greenfield (157164).
F. Griffiths (329947).
C. R. Haller (505103).
R. H. B. Hampson (538383).
S. Handley (344995).
C. T. Hattin (349464).
E. E. Hawkes (514054).
A. E. Hawkridge (329437).
K. Hayward (562736).
T. H. F. Hayward (506553).
A. V. Henshaw (1166769), RAFVR.
H. C. Hooper (349099).
S. E. Humphries (517241).
C. W. J. Hysted (590583).
R. Jackson (512713).
P. G. W. Jacobi (515575).
P. M. Jacobs (349832).
J. W. Jenkins (353974).
P. W. Johnson (363012).
R. Johnstone (358342).
A. Jones (344603).
A. A. Kemster (911654), RAFVR.
W. T. Killock (342551).
J. H. W. Lamey (567664).
E. W. Law (552491).

S. F. Leaman (333645).
A. V. Lewis (313805).
C. E. Little (334441).
W. A. Lord (10898).
S. E. Lovelock (505307).
W. J. D. McCarthy (364950).
E. W. Mableson (1128014), RAFVR.
H. Marriott (50835).
A. J. Marsh (335593).
G. E. Marshall (561826).
G. Mason (561274).
J. E. Mason (155342).
A. J. May (51110).
F. C. Mayoh (1325533), RAFVR.
J. Montgomery (333324).
J. W. Morgan (346325).
A. H. Murison (522783).
G. H. Murray (518682).
S. O. Musgrove (352106).
L. R. Newing (365523).
F. H. Nichols (366365).
J. T. Norman (512791).
W. R. O'Hara (341740).
H. E. Owens (560368).
L. J. Padbury (615985).
W. A. Pilling (357324).
J. E. Potts (351543).
R. R. Powell (352007).
F. Priestley (517226).
M. Proctor (191712).
A. N. Pryce (356380).
C. H. Pusey (515871).
A. H. Richardson (357042).
H. Richardson, (618047).
G. Robberts (514870).
G. Roffey (518929).
T. E. Rourke (564287).
W. L. Rowe (566826).
A. J. Sabine (353758).
C. W. Scase (508960).
F. P. Scullion (590719).
J. J. Seddon (590540).
W. J. Sharpe (513014).
M. A. Sheenan (510720).
H. E. Sheffield (590049).
E. F. V. Sherwell (590362).
T. L. B. Shoolbread (748399).
A. B. Smith (284).
C. J. Smith (354398)
W. Smith (518264).
J. H. Southworth (355980).
W. H. Sowden (512618).
J. S. Sowerby (513130).
R. Spencer (69).
P. F. Spurgeon (334422).
G. L. Stephenson (355057).
T. G. Stevens (361616).
R. Stewart (370422).
R. B. Tancock (510553).
C. C. Taylor (522197).
R. Taylor (520732).
E. Thompson (656095).
V. C. Thornton (518620).
R. G. Timms (365068).
W. E. Tripp (1377051), RAFVR.
L. T. Tugwell (248058).
J. E. Turnham (357915)
T. H. Vallis (337962).
T. B. Walker (591117).
A. A. Warren (328645).
W R. Warren, (561406).
W. H. Wedlock (27786).
G. Weedon (509029).
J. F. White (224892).
W. White (356226).
H. Wilkinson (524683).
A. Wilkinson (509804).
S. Willcocks (590760).
H. Williams (513249).
H. V. Willmott (356159).
H. A. Wolf (752075), RAFVR.
S. C. R. Woollen (514934).
J. O. M. Yardley (357901).
E. Young (510906).
M. W. Young (361755).

Acting Warrant Officers

G. E. Baker (366025).
D. Blackmore (561459).
J. H. Barnes (803170).
H. Buckley (1123260).
A. R. Gill (804176), Auxiliary Air Force.
W. B. Barker (528368).
A. A. Harrow (335171).
G. L. Holland (519939).
D. T. Jenkins (515840).
C. W. Kidby (366134).

E. A. Merrifield (761305).
S. G. Murphy (525937)
E. J. Perry (353360).
D. Poole (517990).
A. W. Pragnell (561077).
B. A. A. Snook (591019).
J. A. Martin (364923).
J. B. Martin (591047).
G. A. G. Waters (541781).
J. E. Wiggin (528247).

Flight Sergeants

358949 S. J. Alden.
902659 A. G. Alderton.
365136 L. J. Allen.
1430616 G. A. Arrowsmith, RAFVR.
563721 W. Auckland.
1334065 A. P. Baines, RAFVR.
743159 H. M. Ball, RAFVR.
1504649 D. D. Balmer, RAFVR.
968702 E. Barker, RAFVR.
563521 G. W. H. Barkham.
560546 W. J. Beale.
560242 C. L. Bell.
1401790 F. N. Bellamy, RAFVR.
568758 D. Bennett.
561018 T. Bishop.
535296 J. J. Black.
649238 S. G. Blunden.
348594 S. J. Bollen.
563519 G. Booth.
1554547 G. G. Boswell, RAFVR.
1133622 P. A. Brade, RAFVR.
513514 H. M. G. Branch.
561067 S. H. Brayley.
1337378 H. C. J. Brewer, RAFVR.
701215 H. W. Broughton, RAFVR.
563446 L. G. Brown.
523368 E. W. Browning.
561465 R. J. Brindley.
353554 A. T. Burgess.
1332969 A. W. J. Burns, RAFVR.
560549 F. W. Burt.
363365 A. F. Butler.
624907 D. W. Butler.
977647 A. F. Butterworth, RAFVR.
532334 J. M. Carine.
365215 E. G. Carr.
533501 A. Cartwright.
562661 L. G. Castle.
337498 J. R. Cathmore.
1198093 E. J. Chapman, RAFVR.
564580 L. J. R. Chedzey.
515713 F. H. Chitham.
366039 C. J. Clapp.
611759 L. Clark.
778975 R. M. Clark, RAFVR.
355729 W. A. Clark.
1002829 R. Clarke, RAFVR.
1254288 B. Clegg, RAFVR.
565700 R. J. Coad.
1193553 D. K. Colburn, RAFVR.
365688 J. F. Collins.
942863 F. S. Cooper, RAFVR.
620297 G. Copley.
570150 C. W. Cornish.
566654 J. Corser.
543058 W. E. Cousins.
245690 J. Cowell.
370276 E. W. CoX.
1268144 E. E. P. Coxall, RAFVR.
1795057 S. Craig, RAFVR.
816042 W. E. S. Crane, Auxiliary Air Force.
1377025 P. H. Crick, RAFVR.
560562 R. Cridge.
626502 N. Cumber.
1257927 W. C. Dawkins, RAFVR.
810054 C. N. Davies, Auxiliary Air Force.
1308346 W. J. De Bois, RAFVR.
1155403 E. J. Derges, RAFVR.
628402 J. Dickenson.
1379185 R. D. Dinsdale, RAFVR.
364608 N. E. Doe.
535486 C. R. Downey.
571820 F. W. H. Driver.
855864 A. S. Dutton, Auxiliary Air Force.
364631 S. J. E. Easton.
366092 A. Edington.
560747 G. K. England.
1314546 O. G. Erasmus, RAFVR.
1452227 C. C. Evans, RAFVR.
1531761 D. Evans, RAFVR.
156114 H. Evans.
543011 S. Evans.
620331 W. E. Evans.
561005 C. E. Faulkner.
560113 W. Fawcett.
563116 A. H. Ferguson.
544217 R. Foote.
1144830 F. Fowler, RAFVR.
913310 F. W. Foxcroft, RAFVR.
644805 G. A. Fraser.
1024623 H. Fray, RAFVR.
524767 J. T. P. Frith.
563454 D. A. Gallagher.
568757 V. R. C. Gibbons.
1027214 J. Gibson, RAFVR.
816031 J. A. Gibson, Auxiliary Air Force.
522680 T. B. Glover.
652298 F. E. C. Goatman.
512628 F. A. W. Good.
1007816 E. Goodall.
355 B. E. Goodgame.
565547 T. A. Gould.
811806 L. W. Griffiths, Auxiliary Air Force.
576040 W. Griffiths.
1271597 S. V. Grimes, RAFVR.
563132 B. C. Grimsey.
1315823 G. M. Grossman, RAFVR.
326138 T. E. Groves.
349956 W. E. Haggerty.
1484113 G. D. Hakin, RAFVR.
1238288 G. E. Hales, RAFVR.
567584 W. P. Haley.
514370 T. E. Hall.
564667 H. J. K. Hammond.
515817 H. Harris.
519064 R. J. Harris.
563155 W. Harris.
1355044 F. J. Hart, RAFVR.
761110 J. Harvey, RAFVR.
658512 L. Hawkes.
1204972 W. Headington, RAFVR.
1481816 A. Heap, RAFVR.
561149 A. W. Herd.
335673 C. F. Hersey.
540558 B. H. Heyhoe.
626803 J. J. Hickey.
350144 H. G. Hoad.
365020 L. Hoare.
351165 J. W. Hodds.
750147 J. Hogan, RAFVR.
1378564 J. McL. Holms, RAFVR.
550413 W. S. Holmes.
1162723 B. N. Hoole, RAFVR.
1151951 G. D. Hooton, RAFVR.
919009 W. T. Hopkins, RAFVR.
532891 G. A. Hopgood.
560244 D. I. Hoskins.
916174 W. J. Houlden, RAFVR.
563797 T. J. Howard.
567136 T. J. Howard.
515218 D. G. C. Humphries.
1284322 A. E. W. Hunt, RAFVR.
941800 W. H. Hunter, RAFVR.
359968 P. S. Hurst.
357668 F. T. Hutch.
364098 W. C. Hutchins.
1380041 J. A. Hutchinson, RAFVR.
1291190 H. J. Hutt, RAFVR.
1132644 T. H. Hutt, RAFVR.
524396 H. N. Ingram.
512413 R. S. E. Isherwood.
635143 J. Jack.
531747 F. A. Jarrett.
1166904 D. L. Jeffery, RAFVR.
1206789 E. R. Jeffery, RAFVR.
624183 E. E. John.
541210 J. F. Johnson.
938726 W. D. Johnson, RAFVR.
335275 E. C. Jones.
507925 J. F. Jones.
345467 T. Jones.
560500 H. A. Jude.
616448 F. P. Kelly.
981474 H. T. Kemp, RAFVR.
656369 J. Kennedy.
1288372 E. K. Kettlewell, RAFVR.
1172051 A. J. S. E. Kimber, RAFVR.
1332766 J. A. Kyte, RAFVR.
566359 D. W. Lamplugh.
622254 A. J. Last.
540210 W. G. Latter.
590910 D. P. J. Lean.
1180518 J. V. Lee, RAFVR.

1551280 J. H. Leiper, RAFVR.
349116 J. H. Lever.
1184540 R. L. Lincoln, RAFVR.
1309285 N. J. Linturn, RAFVR.
364882 J. Lloyd.
564910 H. Loach.
564881 P. H. Lockett.
1066584 G. A. Loveday, RAFVR.
1467116 L. R. Lovitt, RAFVR.
994674 E. T. Lund, RAFVR.
516713 R. Lynn.
362083 G. F. McConnell.
512537 S. R. McCrudden.
1377432 G. MacGregor, RAFVR.
17734 J. D. McKay.
791118 D. McLeish, RAFVR.
365301 H. B. Mack.
1389205 K. G. W. Mantock, RAFVR.
621958 S. J. Maples.
501811 N. S. Maryon.
347815 W. B. Marshall.
562824 C. H. Mason.
1378347 G. H. Mewies, RAFVR.
938159 K. Midwood, RAFVR.
562205 S. Mills.
567706 G. Milner.
560341 V. W. Moon.
2627 568754 D. G. Moore.
560849 E. N. Moore.
755222 P. Moore, RAFVR.
750489 C. G. Morley, RAFVR.
1318008 H. E. Morris, RAFVR.
564892 J. Morris, RAFVR.
1239018 R. Moseley, RAFVR.
538492 H. A. Muckle.
560350 F. J. Mullins.
564780 J. Mumbray.
519882 J. Murphy.
560339 P. C. Musty.
562237 J. A. P. Neill.
643033 A. S. Newnham.
911646 A. P. Newman, RAFVR.
634204 D. J. Norman.
356654 W. G. T. Nunn.
364911 F. C. Opie.
565659 N. W. Padley.
521453 A. E. Palmer.
777756 D. J. N. Palmer, RAFVR.
1386358 H. E. Palmer, RAFVR.
1387238 W. P. Pankhurst, RAFVR.
1338350 F. C. Parry, RAFVR.
1213718 L. A. T. Parsons, RAFVR.
1063478 J. Patterson, RAFVR.
542640 F. P. G. Payne.
562855 F. W. Payne.
952728 A. G. Pearson, RAFVR.
366367 R. J. Peel.
910372 L. Peck, RAFVR.
566798 R. A. Pellow.
337299 W. J. Penton.
565934 F. Perrin.
569143 W. D. Perrott.
564295 T. A. Peters.
752716 R. F. Piercy, RAFVR.
566308 C. Pike.
510680 E. P. PlLkington.
244938 C. F. Pitt.
521571 W. Pittam.
16013 J. J. Plummer.
1077747 E. D. Poulter, RAFVR.
1265057 R. W. Price, RAFVR.
561618 G. Prior.
1479291 H. Pritchard-Roberts, RAFVR.
361727 E. D. Proctor.
565749 J. M. Ramage.
799979 G. R. L. Ramsay, RAFVR.
905065 A. W. Ramsey, RAFVR.
1179592 B. T. Rea, RAFVR.
547497 R. M. Reed.
564770 J. C. Rees.
937847 D. M. Richmond, RAFVR.
388787 C. Rider.
510626 E. A. Robins.
524926 J. Robinson.
517509 R. W. Roe.
590737 H. A. Roper.
1270344 L. Rose, RAFVR.
942736 R. V. Rowley, RAFVR.
808138 J. W. Roy, Auxiliary Air Force.
366177 H. E. W. Russell.
1375672 V. C. Ryder, RAFVR.
568678 R. J. Sanders.
1132936 K. Sanderson, RAFVR.
567310 A. C. Sansom.
566424 J. Salt.
364288 W. F. Sargent.
562289 E. S. C. Sawiders.
963374 E. Scott.
63651 T. R. Scott.
411464 J. L. Seaborne.
983777 R. Seddon, RAFVR.
562626 R. Shakespeare.
565104 C. Sherwood.
1306802 D. J. Shiel.
551056 R. A. Shore.
621194 G. T. Short.
364173 A. L. H. Simmonds.
353246 W. J. Simpkin.
567794 D. Sims.
511672 C. F. Skene.
548140 J. A. Skilton.
566090 J. Small.
370064 A. E. Smee.
328801 A. E. E. Smith.
344122 G. H. Smith.
353206 J. Smith.
516425 J. W. R. Smith.
563217 P. E. Smith.
89302 T. W. Smith.
565007 A. M. Sobey.
1382907 H. F. Spence, RAFVR.
251541 P. W. Stanghan.
566900 G. W. L. Stanley.
560224 J. R. Stares.
328969 J. R. Steers.
591122 R. Stimson.
636773 G. B. Stratford.
1109894 J. R. Sutton, RAFVR.
566670 E. G. Tarr.
565425 F. Thompson.
1586246 G. P. Thomson, RAFVR.
411460 J. Thomson.
565217 G. Timms, RAFVR.
1379315 A. Todd.
1330282 C. H. W. Tracy.
205238 N. S. G. Tweed.
1397186 G. H. Tyler, RAFVR.
325399 H. A. Vickery.
565815 W. C. F. Wade.
642275 R. E. Waight.
1318811 J. A. Wainwright, RAFVR.
562379 A. Waldron.
514545 L. F. Warren.
749924 S. R. Warsop, RAFVR.
1561612 J. J. Waters, RAFVR.
616539 C. R. Watson.
548157 M. E. Watts.
536518 J. Waugh.
941377 T. Whitney, RAFVR.
959550 J. Wilkord, RAFVR.
565831 H. J. M. Wilkinson.
564915 R. J. Wilkinson.
542111 C. I. Williams.
974139 R. Williams, RAFVR.
590922 T. Williams.
302545 F. Williamson.
356242 F. W. H. Williamson.
1193918 H. B. Williamson, RAFVR.
1015771 R. A. Willis, RAFVR.
563594 E. Wilson.
351369 L. V. Wilson.
537612 W. H. Wilson.
1005002 A. L. Winston, RAFVR.
1230352 E. Winstanley, RAFVR.
937374 W. C. Wood, RAFVR.
516953 F. E. Woolley.
1268785 G. E. Woolnough, RAFVR.
1252626 J. W. Worden, RAFVR.
532007 G. P. Wright.
159081 H. W. Wright.
563242 J. A. Wright.
1077241 A. Yates, RAFVR.
949572 A. Young, RAFVR.

Acting Flight Sergeants

701110 A. E. Acer, RAFVR.
744272 C. L. Armstrong, RAFVR.
1266318 R. Bentley, RAFVR.
970115 S. Blackwood, RAFVR.
334169 W. J. Brandon.
1006893 G. P. Brooks, RAFVR.
507793 H. N. Campbell.
965126 W. C. G. Cartwright, RAFVR.
59450 W. Crane, RAFVR.
632477 P. Docherty.
545222 J. A. Donaldson.
523369 S. C. Edgecombe.
411329 O. O. Evison.
1284123 E. J. Finch, RAFVR.
911702 K. E. Fountain, RAFVR.
1012823 E. Grant, RAFVR.
1406945 L. C. Harris, RAFVR.
1377299 T. St. C. Harrison, RAFVR.
567184 R. L. Hellior.
422077 F. L. Hutchinson.
1256539 D. J. H. James, RAFVR.

550583 M. Jones.
1285361 F. F. Keeling, RAFVR.
546769 V. McKee.
524402 G. P. Mitchell.
340579 A. W. H. Morse.
529276 G. Mozley.
11668 W. A. Needham.
1407029 H. B. Niblo, RAFVR.
653038 R. R. L. Peers.
319894 P. J. Silk, RAFVR.
531374 D. G. Smart.
954361 R. Smith, RAFVR.
753138 R. E. P. Smith.
770475 C. R. Stanmore.
570732 L. W. Sutton.
874796 K. E. Trundle, Auxiliary Air Force.
526935 W. W. Watt.
1258204 E. T. Wellard, RAFVR.
638217 T. E. White.
911241 M. J. Wright, RAFVR.

Sergeants

1360431 T. G. S. Abbott, RAFVR.
1467573 E. P. Adams, RAFVR.
962476 L. W. Adams, RAFVR.
950257 B. G. Airey, RAFVR.
1176533 R. S. Allman, RAFVR.
1286073 C. V. Anderson, RAFVR.
911958 C. G. Angel, RAFVR.
1167084 S. C. W. Annear, RAFVR.
914930 A. F. Appleton, RAFVR.
615069 G. H.Archbold, RAFVR.
292218 B. G. Ashby.
548959 L. Ashworth.
943364 J. A. Askew, RAFVR.
1222226 W. H. Attikin, RAFVR.
618012 E. S. Ayling.
635811 F. Baker.
771963 R. J. Baker, RAFVR.
1261742 A. W. Ball, RAFVR.
752032 R. J. Ball, RAFVR.
1207280 H. G. Barlow, RAFVR.
545803 H. Barraclough.
10252555. R. Bates, RAFVR.
993535 H. M. Battersby, RAFVR.
564107 R. R. Batty.
1001546 W. Baugh, RAFVR.
771164 H. Baxter, RAFVR.
198885 J. F. Baxter.
1009719 F. Beasley, RAFVR.
750753 F. S. Bell, RAFVR.
912878 N. Bell, RAFVR.
1001090 M. Bentham, RAFVR.
548050 H. Bentley.
241602 J. H. Bentley.
1398326 W. T. Berry, RAFVR.
1506919 L. Betteley, RAFVR.
1200194 E. A. Betts, RAFVR.
1018690 W. H. Blackburn, RAFVR.
749753 A. L. Bloomfield, RAFVR.
611752 J. Bollands.
566936 C. F. Bolt.
1052901 J. A. Bolton, RAFVR.
813039 I. A. Bonner, Auxiliary Air Force.
909688 A. W. Boyce, RAFVR.
978843 J. Y. Boyd, RAFVR.
520973 S. H. Borner.
58299 A. Boyer.
542052 R. Boxsey.
610668 J. C. Brassington.
1150050 R. J. Brend, RAFVR.
750660 R. W. Brewer, RAFVR.
956799 G. Broadbent, RAFVR.
989988 C. G. Broadbridge, RAFVR.
568610 K. B. Brock.
1175813 D. H. F. Brook, RAFVR.
939639 N. W. Brooke, RAFVR.
635174 H. F. Broomfield.
1196393 A. C. J. Brown, RAFVR.
1286044 A. R. Brown, RAFVR.
1271069 H. E. Brown, RAFVR.
1280101 H. F. Brown, RAFVR.
946383 W. Brown, RAFVR.
1237650 L. Budd, RAFVR.
1188620 R. W. L. Bull, RAFVR.
1174780 A. W. C. Burdon, RAFVR.
637884 D. A. Burkett.
525460 C. E. Burkitt.
1161724 G. L. Burrell, RAFVR.
1273816 M. E. Burnham, RAFVR.
566678 F. N. Buss.
903068 H. P. Calvert (deceased), RAFVR.
623657 J. Campbell.
1301496 R. G. Campbell, RAFVR.
771176 T. Campbell, RAFVR.
1125669 C. Cannan, RAFVR.
559217 W. F. Cannell.
809171 G. E. C. Capes, Auxiliary Air Force.
979703 R. E. Carey, RAFVR.
309331 T. G. Carnell.
942386 R. L. Carr, RAFVR.
1163521 R. V. Carvell, RAFVR.
1375131 R. Cass, RAFVR.
1017218 J. E. Cassere, RAFVR.
1388853 F. W. Castle, RAFVR.
968586 M. H. Castle, RAFVR.
1063048 P. B. Chamberlain, RAFVR.
1177387 J. P. Chapman, RAFVR.
1324408 C. Clark, RAFVR.
639694 G. S. Clark.
1345168 J. M. S. Clark, RAFVR.
1600754 H. G. Clarke, RAFVR.
509314 G. Clegg.
979289 J. Clegg, RAFVR.
1106098 A. H. Cobley, RAFVR.
510521 J. C. Cockburn.
644899 K. Cochrane.
975395 R. P. Coe, RAFVR.
560059 W. C. Cogram.
1339738 H. H. Cole, RAFVR.
1007459 R. S. Cole, RAFVR.
770764 W. J. Collett, RAFVR.
633596 E. C. Colley.
1156931 J. Comper, RAFVR.
1202545 A. F. Compton, RAFVR.
550013 A. R. Cook (deceased).
514634 F. G. Cooper.
650507 E. A. Coppen.
1221795 F. G. R. Cory, RAFVR.
328123 W. M. G. Cossor.
1376344 G. A. Cotton, RAFVR.
753693 D. C. Cracknell, RAFVR.
651886 D. Craggs.
1126869 G. T. Craggs, RAFVR.
1475338 W. A. Crawshaw, RAFVR.
517473 R. Crompton.
526181 R. H. Croxford.
908087 F. T. Cuckow, RAFVR.
912502 F. W. Curling, RAFVR.
1183892 S. Dabson, RAFVR.
514788 R. W. Daintrey.
978360 J. G. W. Dale, RAFVR.
909196 I. Davies, RAFVR.
529766 J. R. Davies.
1580346 V. W. Davies, RAFVR.
1055875 H. Davis, RAFVR.
551897 J. M. Davis.
1191341 C. N. Dawson, RAFVR.
1377492 J. A. Dawson, RAFVR.
1172547 W. A. Day, RAFVR.
976598 C. R. Delf, RAFVR.
1273037 F. G. Delfosse, RAFVR.
994271 W. Dickens, RAFVR.
1001647 E. Dimaline, RAFVR.
915924 G. H. Doman, RAFVR.
630157 J. J. Doyle.
526159 J. A. Drewell.
1203268 R. Drury, RAFVR.
620199 R. C. Dunn.
619461 J. D. Dwyer.
747107 T. W. Eade, RAFVR.
534487 S. G. Easingwood.
1009226 E. H. Eastbury, RAFVR.
906633 C. W. E. P. Edwards, RAFVR.
640411 V. Edwards.
568799 P. Elms.
540603 F. Elston.
1011757 G. A. Elston, RAFVR.
524278 D. A. Evans.
572560 G. Everitt.
618908 J. S. Farquhar.
527892 F. Farren.
905843 H. E. Featherstone, RAFVR.
1200850 S. H. Finlay, RAFVR.
970457 C. V. Ford, RAFVR.
1254985 J. R. G. Fordham, RAFVR.
971460 A. G. Foster, RAFVR.
1193600 A. S. R. Fox, RAFVR.
959771 H. C. Freegard, RAFVR.
1391242 C. J. Frenchum, RAFVR.
1210091 H. G. Froggatt, RAFVR.
516234 C. A. Frogley.
1084240 R. T. Frost, RAFVR.
622644 A. K. Furze.
622166 F. Gadsby.
908489 W. W. Garbett, RAFVR.
941920 V. H. Gardham, RAFVR.
1199776 W. Garside, RAFVR.
743293 C. A. Gathercole, RAFVR.
808527 E. Gaukroger, Auxiliary Air Force.
357612 F. Gee.
1013595 A. M. Gellatly, RAFVR.
576370 J. Gittings.
1020225 H. J. Gledhill, RAFVR.
916467 R. R. Goddard, RAFVR.
1118507 H. Gore, RAFVR.
513856 W. H. Gould.
341878 J. Graves.
1287214 L. J. A. Gray, RAFVR.
816095 W. Greer, Auxiliary Air Force.
525554 R. J. Groves.
513756 W. H. Guard.
990398 C. E. Hackett, RAFVR.
1208795 C. F. Hadland, RAFVR.
517722 J. L. Hagger.
1345564 W. Haining, RAFVR.
1484113 G. D. Hakin, RAFVR.
979997 K. H. Halewood, RAFVR.
571236 D. E. Hall.
514089 F. W. Hall.
808137 J. Hall, Auxiliary Air Force.
1060064 S. Hallmark, RAFVR.
1241818 R. F. F. Hammond, RAFVR.
569573 J. E. Harbottle.
1091930 S. Hardaker, RAFVR.
1193170 A. O. Harden, RAFVR.
972175 W. Harley, RAFVR.
574040 P. B. Harris.
650776 T. Harris.
1431226 A. G. Harrison, RAFVR.
1378626 H. G. Harrison, RAFVR.
1204669 H. H. A. Harrison, RAFVR.
1188655 H. F. J. Hart, RAFVR.
1376213 J. M. Hartman, RAFVR.
957561 A. E. Hartshorn, RAFVR.
546547 C. E. Harvey.
936338 R. Haward, RAFVR.
24633 F. R. Hawksworth, RAFVR.
1078009 J. Hayhurst, RAFVR.
1110535 K. G. Hazelton, RAFVR.
1246830 S. G. Heather, RAFVR.
919624 A. H. Heaven, RAFVR.
1437563 W. Hemingway, RAFVR.
750261 E. F. Hemmings, RAFVR.
540151 J. N. Hempstead.
973643 S. L. Henry, RAFVR.
936741 J. Higginson, RAFVR.
540544 E. L. Hill, RAFVR.
648952 G. G. W. Hoadley.
749471 K. S. Hoar, RAFVR.
1382896 T. H. Hobbs, RAFVR.
1063603 A. T. Hodge, RAFVR.
1178022 T. W. Hodges, RAFVR.
1035161 W. R. Hodges, RAFVR.
937431 W. C. Holden, RAFVR.
1250944 W. G. Holder, RAFVR.
1477891 J. H. Holmes, RAFVR.
1583200 T. S. Holmes, RAFVR.
505150 S. W. Hood.
902801 H. Hornby, RAFVR.
249302 C. W. Horner.
1035423 S. Horton, RAFVR.
1443135 H. Hounsome, RAFVR.
847174 E. E. S. Howard, Auxiliary Air Force.
1570068 A. H. Howat, RAFVR.
753270 W. C. Hudson, RAFVR.
956073 A. A. Hulston, RAFVR.
1008801 E. Illingsworth, RAFVR.
591222 A. R. Ingram.
980324 F. E. Jackson, RAFVR.
915839 P. L. H. Jackson, RAFVR.
1281563 S. A. Jaggar, RAFVR.
568736 G. M. Jarratt.
353194 J. J. Jay.
567367 G. T. Johnson.
941588 J. W. H. Johnson, RAFVR.
1672871 W. Johnson, RAFVR.
970000 J. P. Johnstone, RAFVR.
1410146 I. H. Jones, RAFVR.
549184 P. M. Jones.
1432441 R. Jones, RAFVR.
991925 R. J. Jones.
924612 T. B. Jones.
567632 R. H. Juliff, RAFVR.
908857 R. H. Keeble.
912224 L. E. Keemar.
942173 V. E. Keen.
1698466 H. J. Keenan, RAFVR.
640947 W. Kennaway, RAFVR.
1007767 C. Kenyon, RAFVR.
994963 G. W. Kershaw.
746660 K. Kettle, RAFVR.
1194505 S. W. Kibbler, RAFVR.

570402 R. C. Kidd.
1254474 L. R. W. King, RAFVR.
1617961 R. Krammer, RAFVR.
538733 R. Lambert.
355203 L. C. Larking.
1083582 V. Laverick, RAFVR.
77858 J. H. Ledger, RAFVR.
337538 A. E. Lee.
618041 L. N. Lee.
1012930 J. N. Leishman, RAFVR.
1483213 J. J. Little, RAFVR.
702904 R. G. Lloyd, RAFVR.
1160616 R. G. Lock, RAFVR.
942562 B. H. Locke, RAFVR.
1158128 A. C. Lodge, RAFVR.
1017340 J. M. Loftus, RAFVR.
522177 P. J. Loughran.
1267835 D. J. Lucas, RAFVR.
517932 S. K. Lumsdale.
626278 J. McCallum.
1341367 J. S. McCallum, RAFVR.
874726 H. McCrea, Auxiliary Air Force.
925858 C. McCullough, RAFVR.
362085 D. J. MacDonald.
541372 F. McDonald.
1002187 W. C. MacDonald, RAFVR.
344656 S. S. MacFarlane.
1451464 W. H. McGarrighan, RAFVR.
1102384 G. McGeachie, RAFVR.
537529 J. McKinloy.
340038 D. McLaughlin.
1014596 A. S. McPhail, RAFVR.
1454953 A. Madigan, RAFVR.
1451686 N. Madsen, RAFVR.
902374 B. C. Mahoney, RAFVR.
634572 T. F. Maiden.
916326 D. J. Major, RAFVR.
756704 W. Mant, RAFVR.
1154516 V. Mason, RAFVR.
992996 R. D. Matthews, RAFVR.
968091 W. Meace, RAFVR.
1326584 A. H. Meadows, RAFVR.
99515 J. R. J. Mills, RAFVR.
649561 R. Mills.
335179 W. G. Mitchell.
1118189 G. E. Moffitt, RAFVR.
1187056 H. J. Moore, RAFVR.
654344 R. T. Moore.
1061325 S. Morgan, RAFVR.
1579539 C. W. Morley, RAFVR.
1334588 R. M. Morris, RAFVR.
1391128 J. R. R. Mount, RAFVR.
564952 F. M. B. Mullarkey.
78395 R. H. Mullins, RAFVR.
1303293 T. H. Naylor, RAFVR.
570008 I. A. Neilson.
610742 L. K. Nixon.
1188052 F. A. Nobbs, RAFVR.
534980 W. R. Nottingham.
329311 C. Nunn.
979198 T. C. Oakley, RAFVR.
1326725 M. O'Hagan, RAFVR.
521583 D. D. O'Kane.
1240406 H. Oliver, RAFVR.
531109 R. J. Opie.
534731 E. R. Osborne.
1087870 T. A. Osborne, RAFVR.
523293 I. R. Osman.
619639 N. Owen.
1119068 W. H. P. Owen, RAFVR.
1213615 S. Oxley, RAFVR.
801548 H. Page, Auxiliary Air Force.
701207 C. J. Painter, RAFVR.
527107 D. J. Paling.
508187 A. E. Parker.
1459239 D. J. Parker, RAFVR.
915051 G. H. E. Parker, RAFVR.
1031251 G. S. Parker, RAFVR.
1268666 P. J. Parker, RAFVR.
994280 R. Parkinson, RAFVR.
532158 D. A. R. Parr.
574981 F. J. Partridge.
1557969 J. R. Parvin, RAFVR.
947150 R. Paton, RAFVR.
1658659 L. A. Pearce, RAFVR.
1393850 P. Pearl, RAFVR.
567774 T. M. Pearson.
926974 R. Peters, RAFVR.
1557619 J. Picken, RAFVR.
567733 H. G. Pickering.
362545 R. A. Pikesley.
936281 W. J. Plumb, RAFVR.
1180135 H. F. Pollen, RAFVR.
610642 J. Pomfret.
1222677 F. S. Poole, RAFVR.
960313 G. R. Poole, RAFVR.
1262801 E. E. Pooley, RAFVR.
971371 P. Porter, RAFVR.
1194016 E. A. W. Powell, RAFVR.
638442 R. A. W. Price.
1173552 K. M. Priest, RAFVR.
960075 E. T. Probert, RAFVR.
522225 G. Purcell.
575245 H. J. Pyke.
1609399 F. J. Pyle, RAFVR.
1397881 J. E. Rainsford, RAFVR.
647735 O. Ramsden.
1215960 E. J. Rand, RAFVR.
907548 L. W. Ranson, RAFVR.
1443887 R. L. Rawkins, RAFVR.
647052 T. W. Reed.
575147 P. J. Reen.
569448 J. R. Rees.
701085 W. Reeves, RAFVR.
920054 J. W. Reid (deceased), RAFVR.
990677 E. J. Renshaw, RAFVR.
1266947 G. R. Restall, RAFVR.
953092 C. J. Reynolds, RAFVR.
816047 J. Reynolds, Auxiliary Air Force.
540556 J. M. D. Richards.
625031 W. S. Richards.
535243 J. F. Richardson.
544185 A. G. Ricketts.
1293688 E. Ridley, RAFVR.
643945 A. Roberts.
1435093 D. F. Roberts, RAFVR.
642286 H. Roberts.
552488 L. C. Roberts.
1659588 G. W. Robertshaw, RAFVR.
1244938 G. R. E. Robertson, RAFVR.
1007347 T. Robertson, RAFVR.
618467 E. Robinson.
1148035 J. Robinson, RAFVR.
904325 J. C. Robinson, RAFVR.
537181 F. E. Robson.
1173889 E. A. Rolfe, RAFVR.
943995 F. Roper, RAFVR.
517047 C. W. Rose.
1057055 D. Rose, RAFVR.
640422 R. Rowe.
971176 S. Rowland, RAFVR.
777846 A. Rubenstein, RAFVR.
1053715 F. C. Rushton, RAFVR.
955842 W. G. Sackett, RAFVR.
1541060 W. G. Salmon, RAFVR.
909290 R. S. Sander, RAFVR.
1056630 H. Sanderson, RAFVR.
1261549 A. R. Sandoe, RAFVR.
1213122 P. R. Sartain, RAFVR.
1188618 H. S. Scawen, RAFVR.
1393632 R. A. Schlesinger, RAFVR.
941794 R. S. Scott, RAFVR.
1191568 F. E. Seaton, RAFVR.
933321 A. F. Selway, RAFVR.
566958 I. A. Shaw.
1077978 A. Sheekey, RAFVR.
629994 K. D. Sholl.
1028150 J. SlDebotham, RAFVR.
614784 H. E. Simpson.
1008848 J. H. Simpson, RAFVR.
652940 C. E. Smith.
1280367 E. A. Smith, RAFVR.
1129488 J. Smith, RAFVR.
992799 R. D. J. Smith, RAFVR.
540663 S. G. Snellgrove.
1030242 L. P. Spencer, RAFVR.
1358580 C. Staerck, RAFVR.
340815 C. C. Standing.
1330648 C. B. Statham, RAFVR.
1394647 F. W. Steed, RAFVR.
1074939 J. A. Steele, RAFVR.
532601 W. Steele.
939518 P. F. Stephens, RAFVR.
1358226 G. W. Stephenson, RAFVR.
753139 R. H. Steventon, RAFVR.
1202324 C. S. Stokes, RAFVR.
1022872 W. Struthers, RAFVR.
1045962 J. Stuthert, RAFVR.
1104316 C. P. Sutton, RAFVR.
943387 J. Swallow, RAFVR.
1078158 E. M. Swingler, RAFVR.
1402992 E. S. Sykes, RAFVR.
617269 G. T. Synnock.
620810 D. V. Tann.
1294244 L. R. Tanner, RAFVR.
1066982 H. E. Taylor, RAFVR.
1317370 D. F. Thomas (deceased), RAFVR.
1378005 G. B. Thomas, RAFVR.
901618 J. H. J. Thomas, RAFVR.
647521 W. R. Thomas.
1005844 S. J. Thompson, RAFVR.
870814 W. H. Thompson, Auxiliary Air Force.
611909 L. K. Till.
974398 R. H. Tomlinson, RAFVR.
1105460 C. H. Topping, RAFVR.
641779 J. E. Torkildsen.
651272 A. J. Trevis.
1264277 W. G. Tucker, RAFVR.
771153 A. J. Tucker, RAFVR.
1388544 D. R. Tulloch, RAFVR.
1136149 T. D. Turnbull, RAFVR.
159965 A. T. Turner, RAFVR.
1218505 B. A. Turner, RAFVR.
954971 G. Turner, RAFVR.
753653 H. D. M. Turner, RAFVR.
1482218 T. F. Twitchett, RAFVR.
925970 F. J. Twydell, RAFVR.
990061 N. A. Upton, RAFVR.
945520 A. F. M. Vanderstock, RAFVR.
1461718 L. S. Vanner, RAFVR.
1155775 L. H. Vorley, RAFVR.
978899 K. Walker, RAFVR.
1284184 W. J. Walker, RAFVR.
1647345 W. A. Walmsley, RAFVR.
942934 J. Walsh, RAFVR.
1408297 W. H. A. Walters, RAFVR.
362220 H. Wareing.
1432569 L. G. Warminger, RAFVR.
1283409 W. J. Warr, RAFVR.
1263286 E. H. Warren, RAFVR.
1195797 H. A. Warren, RAFVR.
1029258 I. S. Warren, RAFVR.
356755 W. A. Warrington.
931034 G. C. Watkins, RAFVR.
522921 J. Watson.
641954 L. Watson.
973517 D. Webster, RAFVR.
613066 H. Weetcroft.
1409314 F. E. Welland, RAFVR.
987272 T. H. Welsh, RAFVR.
1694651 D. J. Welsteed, RAFVR.
64933 A. W. West.
1077746 R. W. West, RAFVR.
908925 L. W. Westlake, RAFVR.
918928 A. J. H. Westley, RAFVR.
1189979 F. G. Wheeler, RAFVR.
940111 R. G. Whitaker, RAFVR.
516640 V. R. White.
1191380 N. H. Whiting, RAFVR.
537277 J. Whitton.
637396 F. B. Wilding.
1061157 A. Wilkinson, RAFVR.
1465381 D. E. Williams, RAFVR.
1177814 H. G. Williams, RAFVR.
1257986 L. Williams, RAFVR.
918191 R. A. Williams, RAFVR.
960472 T. B. Williams, RAFVR.
551903 D. G. Willocks.
923513 F. J. Willoughby, RAFVR.
1138798 J. S. Wilson, RAFVR.
633770 W. C. A. Wilson.
1670169 A. E. Winyard, RAFVR.
964377 F. A. Wooding, RAFVR.
1123606 R. R. H. Worthington, RAFVR.
1220969 E. H. Wright, RAFVR.
569423 R. Wright.
1160036 R. C. Yates, RAFVR.
1127192 L. Yeomans, RAFVR.
1465418 W. R. H. Yexley, RAFVR.
355472 F. J. Young.

Acting Sergeants

1420795 C. F. N. Cockerill, RAFVR.
918365 J. H. A. Cowen, RAFVR.
1258572 D. F. Gallagher, RAFVR.
525668 M. J. Kelly.
919658 G. C. Morton, RAFVR.

1016626 H. Rothwell, RAFVR.
1301750 R. F. Taylor, RAFVR.
744897 K. C. Twaite, RAFVR.
1175007 J. D. A. Vaughan, RAFVR.
1190025 R. Watson, RAFVR.

Corporals

1101278 C. D. Abernethy, RAFVR.
1072456 L. G. Adams, RAFVR.
996090 T. R. Aitchison, RAFVR.
1366694 C. Alexander, RAFVR.
638458 G. O. A. Algar.
1611847 G. E. Allen, RAFVR.
1166562 A. E. Allsop, RAFVR.
1502359 C. A. Anderson, RAFVR.
925103 W. F. Angel, RAFVR.
778205 A. Armstrong, RAFVR.
1118540 R. N. Arthur, RAFVR.
1410805 J. D. Ashplant, RAFVR.
1063209 N. Ashurst, RAFVR.
1106371 J. H. Aspinall, RAFVR.
115448 H. Atkinson, RAFVR.
757569 R. J. Avis, RAFVR.
1219362 K. G. Avison, RAFVR.
1023758 L. G. Bailey, RAFVR.
913067 T. E. Baily, RAFVR.
1258318 M. R. Baker, RAFVR.
644734 W. A. Ball.
650226 C. J. Barrow.
907221 I. C. Bartlett, RAFVR.
917013 S. Basham, RAFVR.
1305382 S. H. Bastian, RAFVR.
750262 S. E. Bate, RAFVR.
943309 L. Beall, RAFVR.
624627 T. J. C. Bedford.
1144729 W. Bedford, RAFVR.
635245 H. Beech.
1088615 A. Bell, RAFVR.
1030865 R. A. Belsham, RAFVR.
1008826 C. Benson, RAFVR.
640368 C. J. Berry.
1028621 S. R. Berry, RAFVR.
547991 R. H. Best.
959114 H. H. Billing, RAFVR.
1293220 G. F. Birch, RAFVR.
1259697 R. F. Bird, RAFVR.
951604 H. H. Boaden, RAFVR.
970385 H. E. Bolt, RAFVR.
1041699 C. Boocock, RAFVR.
1035877 J. K. Booth, RAFVR.
988257 G. A. Bootland, RAFVR.
1171566 G. L. Borley, RAFVR.
1150986 J. W. Borley, RAFVR.
1163834 L. S. Boyce, RAFVR.
935843 L. W. Bradley, RAFVR.
973362 T. J. Bradley, RAFVR.
614808 F. Bradwell.
641316 T. D. Brady.
1259621 R. Brand, RAFVR.
1350918 R. A. Brehaut, RAFVR.
1217638 J. O. Brewe, RAFVR.
615209 S. Brighton.
1058764 F. Broadbent, RAFVR.
1028869 H. Broadbent, RAFVR.
1653371 L. T. Brock, RAFVR.
1371456 S. A. Broderick, RAFVR.
813230 E. C. Brooks, Auxiliary Air Force.
1201668 J. E. Brooks, RAFVR.
958016 D. Broomhead, RAFVR.
870931 B. T. Brown, Auxiliary Air Force.
1515758 G. S. Brown, RAFVR.
1175690 H. F. Brown, RAFVR.
1130236 H. G. Brown, RAFVR.
1186557 J. D. Brown, RAFVR.
1154770 M. Brown, RAFVR.
961955 R. Brown, RAFVR.
1026250 R. F. S. Brown, RAFVR.
547517 T. N. Brown.
1188453 G. W. Bruce, RAFVR.
1019765 W. J. Brunton, RAFVR.
1208109 E. C. Bull, RAFVR.
1156884 N. Bumstead, RAFVR.
1031923 J. R. Bunn, RAFVR.
1198266 J. Burroughs (deceased), RAFVR.
1015652 J. H. Burton, RAFVR.
1272920 E. C. Butcher, RAFVR.
1200527 E. R. P. Cadwallader, RAFVR.
1503488 T. K. Carruthers, RAFVR.
1023754 C. R. Carter, RAFVR.
1443316 J. Carter, RAFVR.
1617610 A. J. G. Carthy, RAFVR.
1210029 S. Cartlidge, RAFVR.
1019654 C. Cartwright, RAFVR.
1380242 E. A. Cavalier, RAFVR.
916999 E. L. Chalk, RAFVR.
924263 L. W. Chalk, RAFVR.
622471 W. L. Chalmers.
1357661 F. C. Chiddention, RAFVR.
625941 G. F. W. Chirgwin.
1347544 A. C. Christie, RAFVR.
936330 D. H. Clamp, RAFVR.
1280731 K. G. Clarke, RAFVR.
1123945 H. Clifford, RAFVR.
1371659 W. O. Clubb, RAFVR.
2215751 A. Cluderay, RAFVR.
1086065 V. S. Coggon, RAFVR.
842547 S. C. Coking, Auxiliary Air Force.
924903 W. G. Cole, RAFVR.
944510 G. W. Collinson, RAFVR.
1469106 J. H. Colsell, RAFVR.
1110979 P. Comer, RAFVR.
968805 E. G. Conium, RAFVR.
1156930 J. A. C. Constable, RAFVR.
995011 G. A. Cook, RAFVR.
933882 W. H. Cook, RAFVR.
1150898 R. N. Cooper, RAFVR.
990698 S. G. Cooper, RAFVR.
623099 V. A. Cooper.
1272189 R. D. Copperwheat, RAFVR.
947363 W. F. Copson, RAFVR.
1223450 H. L. Corbett, RAFVR.
994872 K. Corbin, RAFVR.
905576 A. A. Cordes, RAFVR.
1072021 A. Cotgreave, RAFVR.
1482799 W. Coulson, RAFVR.
912819 W. T. Cowell, RAFVR.
999679 J. Crain, RAFVR.
1119652 A. Croadsdell, RAFVR.
954164 H. Crown, RAFVR.
1002420 S. Cubbison, RAFVR.
14644007 C. G. Currell, RAFVR.
1365166 W. S. Currie, RAFVR.
1134010 H. Cutts, RAFVR.
650914 R. Daniel.
637284 E. A. Daniels.
1443075 J. D'Armody, RAFVR.
1204495 A. Davies, RAFVR.
1137707 D. T. Davies, RAFVR.
1101405 J. E. Davies, RAFVR.
935650 T. C. Davies, RAFVR.
11617351 E. W. Davis, RAFVR.
1167080 W. G. Deakin, RAFVR.
543569 E. Deaville.
1246694 J. E. Dee, RAFVR.
1290650 A. C. Denne, RAFVR.
1062649 V. M. Denver, RAFVR.
553731 G. H. H. Diaper.
981814 B. A. Dillon, RAFVR.
642589 D. E. A. F. Diplock.
1034856 H. A. Dobson, RAFVR.
943605 R. Dobson, RAFVR.
1200442 H. P. Dodd, RAFVR.
1063707 C. Dodds, RAFVR.
1358497 G. E. Dorsett, RAFVR.
1223774 E. G. Dove, RAFVR.
911933 H. D. Dowsett, RAFVR.
1253569 H. C. Driver, RAFVR.
1359927 A. Duguid, RAFVR.
1158684 F. J. Dunkley, RAFVR.
747390 D. Y. Durrant, RAFVR.
984221 W. A. Duthie, RAFVR.
1272749 G. Dyball, RAFVR.
908171 H. W. Earthroll, RAFVR.
1271155 W. A. Eatten, RAFVR.
777811 S. Ebedes, RAFVR.
1032839 N. Edmondson, RAFVR.
981939 J. W. Edwards, RAFVR.
1223098 W. A. Ekins, RAFVR.
1222389 F. C. Elliott, RAFVR.
1089672 F. Ellis, RAFVR.
952516 R. Emmerson, RAFVR.
966616 H. A. Evans, RAFVR.
1063989 R. P. Evans, RAFVR.
1123070 K. H. Fairbotham, RAFVR.
1057455 L. T. Farey, RAFVR.
1213023 G. F. Farrow, RAFVR.
1128635 H. Fergusson, RAFVR.
1281965 E. E. Flack, RAFVR.
1119893 R. W. H. Flack, RAFVR.
1055625 J. R. Flemans, RAFVR.
1185984 F. G. Fletcher, RAFVR.
1259290 H. A. Fletcher, RAFVR.
1279433 W. E. Fletcher, RAFVR.
953182 L. G. W. Foden, RAFVR.
1110885 W. S. Forbes, RAFVR.
990609 G. S. Fowler, RAFVR.
1084373 R. G. Francis, RAFVR.
1017618 J. Fraser, RAFVR.
1186574 B. K. Freeman, RAFVR.
1291461 R. T. Fuller, RAFVR.
1205353 L. G. Furber, RAFVR.
1178461 C. Gadd, RAFVR.
1257662 C. E. Gage, RAFVR.
1402744 P. J. Gammon, RAFVR.
577528 D. J. Garrod.
1056167 A. Gavin, RAFVR.
907653 L. R. Gear, RAFVR.
1291540 A. L. Gent, RAFVR.
964490 C. M. George, RAFVR.
1200760 A. J. J. R. Gibb, RAFVR.
1178227 A. J. Gibbons, RAFVR.
1488345 F. Gibson, RAFVR.
940126 T. A. Gibson, RAFVR.
1400782 P. Gigg, RAFVR.
930190 H. E. Gigney, RAFVR.
1437038 S. A. Gillinder, RAFVR.
1009873 W. A. Giltrap, RAFVR.
1005179 R. K. Gledhill, RAFVR.
994799 J. Goldie, RAFVR.
867750 J. F. Gordon, Auxiliary Air Force.
1031858 J. J. Gould, RAFVR.
1069107 E. S. Gourlay, RAFVR.
1421249 T. Graves, RAFVR.
1438805 L. S. Gray, RAFVR.
998131 J. Green, RAFVR.
1123071 T. R. Greener, RAFVR.
1084281 G. Griffin, RAFVR.
1081523 L. Griffith, RAFVR.
921387 E. Grose, RAFVR.
1298318 H. Hacking, RAFVR.
1049830 B. Haigh, RAFVR.
1013055 C. C. Hall, RAFVR.
616557 H. Hall.
542229 L. P. Hall.
911795 W. A. Hall, RAFVR.
807156 T. M. Hann, Auxiliary Air Force.
508145 R. S. B. Harlick.
1178953 E. G. Harrington, RAFVR
931406 A. W. Harris, RAFVR.
515788 F. J. Harris.
1281950 G. Harris, RAFVR.
1420939 R. F. Harris, RAFVR.
1033777 G. Harrison, RAFVR.
951989 R. Harrod, RAFVR.
1014530 K. Harston, RAFVR.
918883 D. E. Hartley, RAFVR.
635192 W. J. Harvey.
949860 E. Haslam, RAFVR.
1000109 W. F. Hasnip, RAFVR.
1264750 K. Hassall, RAFVR.
702591 A. R. S. Hastings, RAFVR.
1241808 R. J. Hatton, RAFVR.
1448014 H. L. Hawkes, RAFVR.
924739 E. F. Heard, RAFVR.
750960 E. J. Hemmingway, RAFVR.
575871 C. Henderson.
1070475 F. Herd, RAFVR.
999578 R. W. Hewett, RAFVR.
1101720 W. H. Hewitt, RAFVR.
643872 G. Hide.
637839 G. Higgs.
1195679 E. E. Highgate, RAFVR.
612034 A. Hill.
1241665 H. E. Hine, RAFVR.
777821 K. Hirsch, RAFVR.
904421 J. A. Hirst, RAFVR.
538489 F. Hockin.
1380417 F. J. Holder, RAFVR.
1061337 J. Holder, RAFVR.
1354889 R. V. Holder, RAFVR.
1621318 E. Holdsworth, RAFVR.
1063903 G. F. Holmes, RAFVR.
778137 F. H. Hosie, RAFVR.
1439736 J. L. Howes, RAFVR.
1243191 S. L. Hudson, RAFVR.
1175369 A. Huggins, RAFVR.
1175291 S. G. E. Humphries, RAFVR.
1442132 W. S. Hutchins, RAFVR.
1272001 E. F. Hyde, RAFVR.
1405673 J. M. Hyde, RAFVR.
1101336 G. F. Ibbotson, RAFVR.
989078 A. M. C. Inglis, RAFVR.
1251317 E. Ingram, RAFVR.
1139641 A. Isherwood, RAFVR.
635991 B. F. Jackson.
1497448 E. J. D. Jackson, RAFVR.
1042188 H. Jackson, RAFVR.
1011777 D. Jeens, RAFVR.
1162663 W. F. Johns, RAFVR.
935916 A. Johnson, RAFVR.
1369708 A. Johnson, RAFVR.
1189882 A. B. Johnson, RAFVR.
1059363 D. E. Johnson, RAFVR.
1378076 H. W. B. Johnson, RAFVR.
1310584 F. Johnson, RAFVR.
1392414 A. Jones, RAFVR.
1531839 E. S. Jones, RAFVR.
1170023 L. B. K. Jones, RAFVR.
629550 R. A. Jones.
1048510 S. Jones, RAFVR.
1255118 T. Jones, RAFVR.
541406 T. B. Jones.
1366112 V. Kask, RAFVR.
1374515 G. S. Kay, RAFVR.

538423 W. J. Kay.
535994 H. Kelly.
778045 L. C. Kelly, RAFVR.
777777 P. P. Kelly, RAFVR.
1188040 E. B. Kemp, RAFVR.
1225187 J. W. Kester, RAFVR.
911309 R. Kestila, RAFVR.
1200698 W. R. Keyser, RAFVR.
1208029 F. S. Kingdon, RAFVR.
1275065 J. P. Klinkenberg, RAFVR.
1110785 J. F. Knowles, RAFVR.
1256531 R. A. Knowles (deceased).
923054 D. A. Lacey, RAFVR.
774409 W. E. Lachs, RAFVR.
1369090 D. Laidlaw, RAFVR.
940738 J. H. Laight, RAFVR.
1429937 G. A. Lang, RAFVR.
629907 W. D. Laskey.
1180732 J. W. Laurence, RAFVR.
1174868 R. Lawrence, RAFVR.
955287 T. N. Lawson, RAFVR.
1034358 H. C. Ledbetter, RAFVR.
1482172 V. C. J. Leech, RAFVR.
965619 E. E. Letman, RAFVR.
972803 A. Lightfoot, RAFVR.
526688 E. R. Locking.
1308593 M. D. Lodwick, RAFVR.
1432507 P. F. J. Lorden, RAFVR.
972978 J. Lowe, RAFVR.
628776 G. H. Lumsdon.
1150158 F. G. McCavish, RAFVR.
969862 J. McCreath, RAFVR.
1004959 W. S. MacDonald, RAFVR.
913281 S. McEwan, RAFVR.
539358 J. P. McIlwee.
557724 R. T. McLaren, RAFVR.
1065671 D. McLeod, RAFVR.
1611418 E. A. McShee, RAFVR.
1302763 D. Macauley, RAFVR.
1012063 A. N. Mann, RAFVR.
926923 R. H. K. Manns, RAFVR.
1380515 F. R. Marsh, RAFVR.
998607 J. W. Marshall, RAFVR.
1097299 R. Marshall, RAFVR.
912168 D. S. Mecklenburgh, RAFVR.
977081 R. Meecham, RAFVR.
1026203 D. H. Meldrum, RAFVR.
1478294 A. Merrell, RAFVR.
963167 R. A. V. Merritt, RAFVR.
928028 W. H. Michael, RAFVR.
961583 C. W. G.Middleton, RAFVR.
1096282 A. Milburn, RAFVR.
953336 A. J. G. Mills, RAFVR.
1186930 L. F. Milker, RAFVR.
615954 J. T. Milward.
1129925 C. Mitchell, RAFVR.
549535 E. S. Mitchell.
334479 W. Mitchell.
1017498 W. Mitchell, RAFVR.
626297 W. W. Mitchell.
531969 F. MolyneuX.
1187119 D. B. Morgan, RAFVR.
1150820 K. H. Morgan, RAFVR.
1021985 T. E. Morgan, RAFVR.
1098420 T. S. Morgan, RAFVR.
1446532 W. G. Morgan, RAFVR.
1120019 A. Mottram, RAFVR.
1055417 W. P. Mount, RAFVR.
803483 R. C. Munro, Auxiliary Air Force.
1308237 R. Murfitt, RAFVR.
1011736 W. A. Murray, RAFVR.
1101759 R. C. Mutten, RAFVR.
976276 E. W. Naile, RAFVR.
777753 P. R. Needham, RAFVR.
1097157 R. Needham, RAFVR.
617341 H. G. Nettleton.
962448 L. E. Nibbs, RAFVR.
1538525 A. R. Nicholls, RAFVR.
908100 R. O. H. Nicholls, RAFVR.
965038 J. Nield, RAFVR.
1497500 C. Nightingale, RAFVR.
548477 J. Nimmo.
1384020 G. G. Nokes, RAFVR.
1172212 J. Nunn, RAFVR.
1403574 W. E. Ockelford, RAFVR.
538453 J. Ogilvie, RAFVR.
1194776 W. E. Orme, RAFVR.
1536161 D. R. Page, RAFVR.
1179868 W. Page, RAFVR.
1305074 J. W. Pagett, RAFVR.
1207949 H. E. Palmer, RAFVR.
354590 W. E. Papworth.
996985 H. Parker, RAFVR.
1006845 R. N. Parker, RAFVR.
1240822 L. Patheyjohns, RAFVR.
1047520 F. C. Patrick, RAFVR.
1372050 J. Patterson, RAFVR.
1073011 J. V. Pattison, RAFVR.
1099965 L. E. H. Payne, RAFVR.
1330089 W. E. Pearce, RAFVR.
1139911 J. L. Pearson, RAFVR.
1110370 R. E. Penn, RAFVR.
1017038 H. Pentland, RAFVR.
1030328 L. Perry, RAFVR.
1041406 M. Perry, RAFVR.
1219072 F. Pettit, RAFVR.
638695 R. E. Pettit.
1653333 S. J. Phillips, RAFVR.
1400725 T. A. Phillips, RAFVR.
1081451 F. Picksley, RAFVR.
1194770 W. S. Pile, RAFVR.
1292606 H. A. Plant, RAFVR.
640955 G. Pratt.
951854 C. F. Preston, RAFVR.
617381 B. Price.
1165310 E. S. G. Price, RAFVR.
944320 D. Prowse, RAFVR.
750036 J. T. Pugh, RAFVR.
777927 R. Quicke, RAFVR.
1006875 C. Rae, RAFVR.
1128112 F. R. Rastall, RAFVR.
1118644 J. O. Ratcliffe, RAFVR.
1008318 S. K. Ratcliffe, RAFVR.
1144660 V. Ratcliffe, RAFVR.
987780 A. Rawstron, RAFVR.
1061573 F. Reavley, RAFVR.
616870 D. C. Reddick.
1236888 H. G. Reeve, RAFVR.
645719 L. M. J. Reeve.
754409 S. R. Reeve, RAFVR.
1124695 M. Reid, RAFVR.
1270456 R, J. R. Reid, RAFVR.
701236 A. J. Reynolds, RAFVR.
1530405 E. J. Reynolds, RAFVR.
648031 R. Richards.
1400933 W. C. D. Richards, RAFVR.
1271826 G. H. D. Ridgley, RAFVR.
1183772 W. E. Riley, RAFVR.
1109159 A. T. Rimmer, RAFVR.
1261314 P. C. Rising, RAFVR.
1166854 D. C. Roberts, RAFVR.
1426166 E. Roberts, RAFVR.
1342072.A. H. Robertson, RAFVR.
949127 H. Robinson, RAFVR.
1067313 J. J. Robinson, RAFVR.
961895 J. L. Robinson, RAFVR.
1025388 J. S.Robinson, RAFVR.
1017262 R. Robinson, RAFVR.
940102 T. W. Robinson, RAFVR.
1114500 W. Robinson, RAFVR.
1037116 R. F. Robson, RAFVR.
1368608 W. C. Rodger, RAFVR.
1483532 A. Rodley, RAFVR.
756700 A. C. Rogers, RAFVR.
122238 A. Ross, RAFVR.
1385646 G. E. C. Ross, RAFVR.
1104536 R. Ross, RAFVR.
921328 G. E. Roughton, RAFVR.
921504 L. H. C. Rowland, RAFVR.
995395 E. Rowley, RAFVR.
749081 J. W. Ruffell, RAFVR.
1088589 W. A. Russell, RAFVR.
1154936 C. S. Ryan, RAFVR.
934375 R. G. Sadler, RAFVR.
1218511 P. Sale, RAFVR.
1186440 C. F. Salmon, RAFVR.
1274117 R. J. Salway, RAFVR.
1294864 H. L. E. Sansom, RAFVR.
627897 J. S. Sargent, RAFVR.
1143559 L. J. Sarginson, RAFVR.
1122123 H. M. Saunders, RAFVR.
539831 R. B. Schickle.
919344 G. H. Scott, RAFVR.
1222662 N. F. Scott, RAFVR.
1224222 F. W. Seager, RAFVR.
1092255 W. J. Searle, RAFVR.
973111 J. J. Sergison, RAFVR.
1280272 C. L. Sharp, RAFVR.
1204193 E. J. Sharp, RAFVR.
995173 H. Sharples, RAFVR.
1306923 H. E. R. Shatford, RAFVR.
1032736 H. Shaw, RAFVR.
1191126 F. W. Sheldon, RAFVR.
1059174 E. A. Sherwood, RAFVR.
1281071 B. Shipp, RAFVR.
901775 S. C. Short, RAFVR.
1278599 C. S. Shovell, RAFVR.
1281755 L. C. Sims, RAFVR.
1012053 T. Sims, RAFVR.
1044674 A. Simpson, RAFVR.
1063649 S. Simpson, RAFVR.
1192310 W. P. Skillington, RAFVR.
1087948 J. Skinner, RAFVR.
1018862 S. Slade, RAFVR.
621453 A. Smith.
1175534 E. F. Smith, RAFVR.
127319 E. G. Smith, RAFVR.
548362 F. H. Smith.
1182959 H. G. Smith, RAFVR.
1552371 J. Smith, RAFVR.
1365843 J. A. Smith, RAFVR.
935167 R. Smith, RAFVR.
1158884 R. J. D. Smith, RAFVR.
949812 R. T. Smith, RAFVR.
351924 W. G. Smith.
1037899 W. H. Smith, RAFVR.
1201176 W. R. Smith, RAFVR.
1182006 R. H. Speed, RAFVR.
993876 R. G. Speedy, RAFVR.
1686592 A. Spencer, RAFVR.
941195 E. Spencer, RAFVR.
1427735 G. J. Spiers, RAFVR.
1163421 R. F. Sprackman, RAFVR.
1144451 A. Sproul, RAFVR.
1016678 H. Stafford, RAFVR.
1261292 W. L. Stanbury, RAFVR.
927219 K. R. Stanton, RAFVR.
1370757 G. F. Stark, RAFVR.
1202018 A. A. Starmer, RAFVR.
1007281 W. A. Stephenson, RAFVR.
533210 T. G. Stimson.
1050613 P. V. W. Stockbridge, RAFVR.
974850 B. A. C. Stonell, RAFVR.
749469 G. M. Stott, RAFVR.
1185238 F. J. Streater, RAFVR.
612413 A. J. Stuart.
999478 J. C. Sturgeon, RAFVR.
1077383 J. Sutherland, RAFVR.
932637 A. G. Talbott, RAFVR.
1420060 A. H. J. Tassier, RAFVR.
902427 A. S. Taylor, RAFVR.
1068766 C. E. D. Taylor, RAFVR.
1161671 D. I. Taylor, RAFVR.
1150860 T. E. Taylor, RAFVR.
1287794 R. W. H. Taylor, RAFVR.
649790 T. M. Tear.
1344257 C. D. Thain, RAFVR.
1251492 E. H. Thomas, RAFVR.
1115294 G. J. Thomas, RAFVR.
1137255 T. G. Thomas, RAFVR.
943211 H. Thompson, RAFVR.
1431866 K. E. Toms, RAFVR.
1093574 F. H. Totman, RAFVR.
1036451 E. Townsend, RAFVR.
997252 E. Towse, RAFVR.
744735 W. H. Trainer, RAFVR.
1015891 S. I. J. Trebilcock, RAFVR.
1256926 A. R. Turk, RAFVR.
777901 D. H. Van Der Struys, RAFVR.
1476453 G. Varnham, RAFVR.
778158 J. D. Venables, RAFVR.
11459395. M. Vertigans, RAFVR.
1472292 A. J. Wakefield, RAFVR.
570600 T. H. Walker.
983013 L. N. Walker, RAFVR.
770985 J. Wall, RAFVR.
900385 K. J. Waller, RAFVR.
955432 P. Waterworth, RAFVR.
953591 J. F. Watson, RAFVR.
1175051 L. C. Watson, RAFVR.
1058254 T. W. Watson, RAFVR.
1098990 J. R. Weatherhead, RAFVR.
188349 W. T. H. Welling, RAFVR.
1261494 E. J. A. Wells, RAFVR.
1177931 F. C. Wellum, RAFVR.
629124 D. A. West.
1585674 D. W. West, RAFVR.
553502 V. West.
1026725 J. Weston, RAFVR.
950445 N. Weston, RAFVR.
1156053 C. F. Westwick, RAFVR.
1235407 E. J. Wheare, RAFVR.
1006739, G. W. White, RAFVR.
1459342 T. W. C. White, RAFVR.
610066 A. E. Wilde.
1502151 E. H. Willett, RAFVR.
1149700 S. W. Williams, RAFVR.
1165701 K. R. Wills, RAFVR.
1115593 C. W. Wilson, RAFVR.
1208401 E. A. D. Woodcock, RAFVR.
1531926 F. E. Woolstow, RAFVR.
540919 E. C. Worgan.
1428769 C. W. F. T. Wright, RAFVR.
1284206 F. G. Wright, RAFVR.
1151430 S. W. O. Wright, RAFVR.
1474456 D. W. Yardley, RAFVR.
1113674 V. Young, RAFVR.

Acting Corporals

1493272 N. Burdis, RAFVR.
953464 E. Cavanagh, RAFVR.
1439724 E. R. Churchman, RAFVR.
1500543 J. J. Colligan, RAFVR.
1298594 N. Farrant, RAFVR.
1634324 R. W. Finch, RAFVR.
1514205 P. E. Haines, RAFVR.
1191724 V. G. H. Hemus, RAFVR.

969405 J. A. Martin, RAFVR.
1053979 J. Paterson, RAFVR.
710016 C. H, Radford, RAFVR.
753291 D. J. G. Smart, RAFVR.
1247266 W. G. Wheeler, RAFVR.
858249 J. T. Wild, Auxiliary Air Force.
1223363 H. C. Wright, RAFVR.

Leading Aircraftmen

1545230 J. Ackroyd, RAFVR.
1136329 F. Adams, RAFVR.
1159568 H. J. Adams, RAFVR.
1568174 J. Adams, RAFVR.
1221858 A. W. Albans, RAFVR.
1693233 J. S. Alderson, RAFVR.
982132 R. Alderson, RAFVR.
1139751 N. Allen, RAFVR.
1528762 W. J. Allen, RAFVR.
1290669 R. J. Alway, RAFVR.
816189 D. Anderson, Auxiliary Air Force.
1345500 J. Anderson, RAFVR.
900310 R. J. Andrews, RAFVR.
1518206 D. F. Aldridge, RAFVR.
1870135 G. E. Anslow, RAFVR.
1470415 J. Archer, RAFVR.
1655295 H. T. Arnold, RAFVR.
1438100 H. H. Arrowsmith, RAFVR.
981712 E. Atherton, RAFVR.
1241272 G. W. Austin, RAFVR.
576867 E. J. Bagley.
1385819 J. Bainbridge, RAFVR.
1481045 E. F. G. Baker, RAFVR.
1301913 F. F. J. Baker, RAFVR.
1325016 G. T. Baldwin, RAFVR.
1483831 J. Bangham, RAFVR.
1303922 E. J. Barnes, RAFVR.
1124440 C. Barstow, RAFVR.
617059 H. Battye.
1107667 L. F. Baxter, RAFVR.
1031290 R. H. Beard, RAFVR.
1462733 J. Beddall, RAFVR.
1832228 H. Beetham, RAFVR.
1061178 C. H. Bell, RAFVR.
1205802 M. Bellamy, RAFVR.
942354 R. Binns, RAFVR.
645663 R. G. Blaikie.
1194969 C. Blamire, RAFVR.
1245448 C. Booth, RAFVR.
1037584 W. H. Brierly, RAFVR.
981041 V. C. Britten, RAFVR.
1260741 J. R. H. Broad, RAFVR.
576088 W. M. Brockie.
1249979 H. Brooks, RAFVR.
752400 F. Brooks, RAFVR.
1378777 J. W. Brooksbank, RAFVR.
1538149 R. F. Broome, RAFVR.
1033447 W. T. Broomhead, RAFVR.
1259627 A. E. Brown, RAFVR.
1479221 C. Brown, RAFVR.
964120 W. F. Brown, RAFVR.
1545140 R. Bruce, RAFVR.
944466 W. Bullivant, RAFVR.
1200270 N. F. Bunker, RAFVR.
1078389 J. W. Burden, RAFVR.
1485184 K. Burrell, RAFVR.
1166689 G. W. Butler, RAFVR.
1360425 W. Butlin, RAFVR.
1279083 N. D. Case, RAFVR.
1085771 S. Case, RAFVR.
1543926 E. M. Cairns, RAFVR.
1445769 W. G. H. Carter, RAFVR.
1175564 F. W. A. Chadney, RAFVR.
1070452 F. Chadwick, RAFVR.
1015989 W. J. Chamberlain, RAFVR.
1663743 E. L. Chapman, RAFVR.
1469243 F. G. Chase, RAFVR.
553804 G. W. H. Clapham.
1087950 G. E. Clarke, RAFVR.
1043776 G. S. Clarke, RAFVR.
1165967 T. E. Clarke, RAFVR.
1146673 E. Clough, RAFVR.
1053188 C. L. Coates, RAFVR.
1299638 E. A. Cochrane, RAFVR.
1433026 B. M. Cocks, RAFVR.
1286222 G. Collins, RAFVR.
1632300 S. Collins, RAFVR.
1378815 W. F. Conduit, RAFVR.
1537969 W. Cook, RAFVR.
646643 C. Cooper.
1087044 L. A. Copley, RAFVR.
1303364 T. S. Couper, RAFVR.
1816752 H. R. Cox, RAFVR.
1464054 J. W. Craig, RAFVR.
1272955 H. A. Crearley, RAFVR.
1332845 A. F. Crocker, RAFVR.
1094271 C. E. Cross, RAFVR.
1005453 W. Cruickshank, RAFVR.
1478474 T. Crutchley, RAFVR.
1172472 G. A. S. Currin, RAFVR.
1034380 F. I. Curtis, RAFVR.
1420841 P. M. Dartnall, RAFVR.
980808 G. H. Darwin, RAFVR.
1674461 T. Daniels, RAFVR.
964020 L. Davtes, RAFVR.
1038805 L. C. Davtes, RAFVR.
1128796 R. Davtes, RAFVR.
1449226 C. J. A. Dearlove, RAFVR.
1638643 W. F. Deneham, RAFVR.
1401029 E. C. Densley, RAFVR.
1230933 E. Derbyshire, RAFVR.
1340949 H. Devine, RAFVR.
1570014 G. M. Dewar, RAFVR.
1137534 T. H. Dixon, RAFVR.
1210742 G. R. Doel, RAFVR.
1653402 E. G. Dovey, RAFVR.
1417102 J. V. Downs, RAFVR.
1507410 B. Drape, RAFVR.
748155 P. Drasdo, RAFVR.
1564044 J. H. Drysdale, RAFVR.
848389 A. Dunkley, Auxiliary Air Force.
1503152 W. Dunn, RAFVR.
1234502 D. R. Easton, RAFVR.
1139812 H. Eden, RAFVR.
700900 R. C. Emerson, RAFVR.
1533193 R. Edmondson, RAFVR.
922407 S. G. Edmunds, RAFVR.
1420810 D. Evans, RAFVR.
1064326 W. D. Evans, RAFVR.
1381520 G. H. D. Edwards, RAFVR.
960488 H. E. Edwards, RAFVR.
1092250 L. Edwards, RAFVR.
1143152 L. P. Edwards, RAFVR.
1459450 W. Edwards, RAFVR.
635702 R. V. Faben.
156711 J. C. Ferguson.
1548815 K. Fish, RAFVR.
351564 G. C. Fisher.
961391 H. E. Fisher, RAFVR.
867014 R. Fitzgerald, Auxiliary Air Force.
534714 G. D. Foster.
1438375 H. R. C. Fowler, RAFVR.
1489066 H. France, RAFVR.
1154539 C. E. Fraser, RAFVR.
1373523 J. Freel, RAFVR.
1315278 E. H. Fricker, RAFVR.
1343524 W. Galbraith, RAFVR.
1277847 A. E. Gale, RAFVR.
117584 C. G. Gamble, RAFVR.
1227565 F. J. Gander-Miller, RAFVR.
1446057 F. T. Gant, RAFVR.
1414188 C. Gardner, RAFVR.
1612204 J. F. Garwood, RAFVR.
1095620 L. Gascoigne, RAFVR.
1158463 E. R. Gilbert, RAFVR.
903244 I. Gill, RAFVR.
1613200 I. D. Gladwin, RAFVR.
1343109 A. R. Glen, RAFVR.
1242536 R. Goodman, RAFVR.
1575565 G. R. Gout, RAFVR.
1311574 S. Gowrie, RAFVR.
1202265 G. Gowrley, RAFVR.
1223979 A. C. Grange, RAFVR.
1088278 R. G. Graham, RAFVR.
1155156 W. Grant, RAFVR.
1548401 E. W. Gray, RAFVR.
1283621 L. V. Green, RAFVR.
1120211 W. E. Green, RAFVR.
1660864 C. J. Griffiths, RAFVR.
1130628 E. Griffiths, RAFVR.
1013683 J. T. Griffiths, RAFVR.
1018188 W. L. Griffiths, RAFVR.
1109080 G. N. Haggie, RAFVR.
1529556 H. Haigh, RAFVR.
904504 J. W. Haley, RAFVR.
1182510 G. L. Hanton, RAFVR.
1536070 E. Harbin, RAFVR.
1098508 E. Hargreaves, RAFVR.
1243804 E. A. T. Harris, RAFVR.
951192 J. A. Harris, RAFVR.
1504694 A. Haslam, RAFVR.
1073914 F. W. Haughton, RAFVR.
1638429 W. C. Hayden, RAFVR.
1030333 F. Hemsley, RAFVR.
1052633 A. A. Heslop, RAFVR.
1183301 F. E. Higgins, RAFVR.
1380608 R. W. A. Hill, RAFVR.
1222484 T. S. Hoad, RAFVR.
1411508 R. C. Hobbs, RAFVR.
1532228 S. T. Hodgson, RAFVR.
1226065 S. Holt, RAFVR.
1464992 A. S. Holloway, RAFVR.
1447822 R. W. Houghton, RAFVR.
1502364 S. Houghton, RAFVR.
1144972 E. J. Howard, RAFVR.
1585461 D. L. Hoy, RAFVR.
1107111 E. Hoy, RAFVR.
1237305 D. G. Hudd, RAFVR.
1209631 C. J. Hughes, RAFVR.
1195655 C. W. Humphrey, RAFVR.
1241495 A. T. Hutchins, RAFVR.
1130160 N. J. E. Isaac, RAFVR.
1252174 L. C. Isitt, RAFVR.
983744 A. Izatt, RAFVR.
1499691 D. Jackson, RAFVR.
1288126 J. R. Jackson, RAFVR.
1106490 W. Jackson, RAFVR.
549898 G. F. Jacques.
1657172 E. C. Jeffery, RAFVR.
902061 R. H. Jelf, RAFVR.
1504971 K. B. Jennings, RAFVR.
945118 A. E. Jones, RAFVR.
1354830 E. Jones, RAFVR.
1151638 G. E. Jones, RAFVR.
1124928 S. G. Jones, RAFVR.
1531011 T. Jones, RAFVR.
1134102 T. G. Jones, RAFVR.
1072760 W. E. John, RAFVR.
1286611 R. C. Justice, RAFVR.
1619459 G. Kaye, RAFVR.
1060358 S. J. Keay, RAFVR.
1639905 H. G. King, RAFVR.
1197612 W. King, RAFVR.
1195437 E. C. Kinns, RAFVR.
546295 R. Knaggs.
1193016 C. J. Lakin, RAFVR.
1087804 H. Lane, RAFVR.
1314237 W. E. Langford, RAFVR.
1048390 C. W. Launchbury, RAFVR.
652733 R. C. Lawrence.
1331564 J. C. Leach, RAFVR.

1282966 G. W. Lee, RAFVR.
1613264 G. W. Lee, RAFVR.
1023547 H. Lee, RAFVR.
633004 E. C. Lennon.
1432643 D. G. Lever, RAFVR.
1065457 E. Lewis, RAFVR.
914400 T. G. Lewis, RAFVR.
1347613 T. Lindsay, RAFVR.
1170669 H. Lintott, RAFVR.
911192 A. J. Lloyd, RAFVR.
1281008 R. G. Lloyd, RAFVR.
1546966 E. W. Lovatt, RAFVR.
1264051 W. E. L. Lovatt, RAFVR.
1501856 D. H. N. Lush, RAFVR.
1063296 J. Lynch, RAFVR.
1115464 F. Maiden, RAFVR.
1556892 E. M. McCoy, RAFVR.
1370650 M. McDartlin, RAFVR.
1354720 W. McGowan, RAFVR.
1124330 A. R. MacLeod, RAFVR.
1573018 I. S. McLeod, RAFVR.
1012236 B. Mann, RAFVR.
1358542 T. Manning, RAFVR.
1264138 D. Marchant, RAFVR.
1451181 T. C. Mardling, RAFVR.
1213468 R. H. Markham, RAFVR.
1053983 S. Marshall, RAFVR.
1143157 T. W. Marshall, RAFVR.
1663359 F. H. Marston, RAFVR.
1711807 G. Masters, RAFVR.
1365944 A. G. Matheson, RAFVR.
1335427 J. T. A. Maybey, RAFVR.
1019256 W. Michie, RAFVR.
1063443 E. Middleton, RAFVR.
1372336 L. L. Middleton, RAFVR.
933950 A. Miller, RAFVR.
854104 A. Mills, Auxiliary Air Force.
998772 J. Mills, RAFVR.
1216441 C. Millward, RAFVR.
1226477 J. W. Milward, RAFVR.
1510968 J. M. Moorcroft, RAFVR.
1143174 F. A. Morley, RAFVR.
1161721 D. G. Morris, RAFVR.
1511741 J. W. Morris, RAFVR.
1276202 A. E. Morrish, RAFVR.
1096856 S. Mucklin, RAFVR.
1721769 U. J. Mumford, RAFVR.
1563599, W. F. Murray, RAFVR.
1206389 J. T. Musson, RAFVR.
1155348 J. G. S. Newcombe, RAFVR.
1112076 G. W. Nichol, RAFVR.
1407363 S. L. Nicholas, RAFVR.
981114 L. Nimmo, RAFVR.
1035275 J. Noble, RAFVR.
1465304 A. W. North, RAFVR.
1028623 R. B. Gates, RAFVR.
1093886 C. O'Donohue, RAFVR.
1575799 C. R. O'Grady, RAFVR.
1112072 J. B. Osborne, RAFVR.
1273165 D. A. Overton, RAFVR.
1474538 D. W. T. Oxtoby, RAFVR.
1045869 J. P. Page, RAFVR.
1474188 A. D. Panero, RAFVR.
1485586, K. A. Parker, RAFVR.
1403547 H. R. Parnell, RAFVR.
1481745 L. E. W. Parsons, RAFVR.
912457 E. G. Pasque, RAFVR.
1552241 J. P. Paterson, RAFVR.
1205570 J. H. Pearman, RAFVR.
1155562 R. F. Perfect, RAFVR.
1182307 N. Perkins, RAFVR.
1620170 S. E. V. Pescud, RAFVR.
1516040 J. A. Phillip, RAFVR.
538233 W. N. Phillips.
1348072 T. Pickering, RAFVR.
1287751 H. H. Pilcher, RAFVR.
1573865 G. Pirie, RAFVR.
1695187 B. Plant, RAFVR.
1484830 G. E. Platt, RAFVR.
1457926 N. R. Plowman, RAFVR.
1832442 W. G. H. Plummer, RAFVR.
1489573 K. Pocock, RAFVR.
974285 E. Pollard, RAFVR.
1525173 R. V. Porteous, RAFVR.
1224988 A. Price, RAFVR.
1243639 J. R. Price, RAFVR.
855783 L. J. Price, Auxiliary Air Force.
1281847 R. Price, RAFVR.
649650 L. E. Prisley.
3777585 T. Purves, RAFVR.
1463497 F. Pusey, RAFVR.
1115855 G. F. Rae, RAFVR.
1273318 E. A. Raine, RAFVR.
1050762 C. J. Rainford, RAFVR.
1182951 B. H. T. Redwood, RAFVR.
1201207 F. J. E. Renvoize, RAFVR.
1563935 R. S. Renwick, RAFVR.
1402689 T. L Reynolds, RAFVR.
1296699 W. J. Reynolds, RAFVR.
1216131 R. J. Rhodes, RAFVR.
1060817 W. Rice, RAFVR.
958867 E. E. Richards, RAFVR.
1171937 J. R. Richards, RAFVR.
1031607 R. M. Rickard, RAFVR.
1397966 S. Roe, RAFVR.
1279968 E. J. Roberts, RAFVR.
1105721 C. A. Robertson, RAFVR.
973794 H. Robertson, RAFVR.
1052865 G. B. Robinson, RAFVR.
1485520 L. Robinson, RAFVR.
1378311 H. Robson, RAFVR.
1145841 J. H. Rose, RAFVR.
1443106 R. E. Rose, RAFVR.
999439 H. N. Rostum, RAFVR.
1190640 A. G. Rowles, RAFVR.
1079397 S. A. Sadler, RAFVR.
1612272 W. Saile, RAFVR.
1331941 H. R. Salisbury, RAFVR.
1526822 R. A. Sanders, RAFVR.
1289364 F. W. Savidge, RAFVR.
613453 H. W. Scarisbrook.
1674052 G. Scofield, RAFVR.
962333 K. I. Shoular, RAFVR.
1163870 A. Sears, RAFVR.
775814 M. Shnejurson, RAFVR.
1440507 S. G. Sibley, RAFVR.
1493473 A. W. Sidey, RAFVR.
1176362 E. Simmons, RAFVR.
1050223 E. Simpson, RAFVR.
1227302 R. A. Sinclair, RAFVR.
1113220 A. E. Sinfield, RAFVR.
1235887 E. H. Skipworth, RAFVR.
1512390 H. Sleaford, RAFVR.
1554323 J. B. Slight, RAFVR.
1612176 K. S. Sline, RAFVR.
949892 A. Smith, RAFVR.
1408618 E. R. Smith, RAFVR.
1174763 F. C. Smith, RAFVR.
1175101 F. S. Smith, RAFVR.
1532566 H, Smith, RAFVR.
1197612 J. Smith, RAFVR.
1122404 S. Smith, RAFVR.
1099241 R. E. Spicer, RAFVR.
1493462 G. W. Sprawson, RAFVR.
1188615 A. E. Squire, RAFVR.
1166425 P. G. Squire, RAFVR.
1249025 C. H. Stanners, RAFVR.
956696 R. Statham, RAFVR.
1065554 G. E. Steed, RAFVR.
983559 G. Stevens, RAFVR.
1019671 J. J. D. Stevens, RAFVR.
1051376 W. St. Paul, RAFVR.
621034 W. S. Street.
1005021 G. E. Sutcliffe, RAFVR.
1264639 J. G. Sumner, RAFVR.
1502049 C. J. Swaffield, RAFVR.
1013151 T. F. Sweet, RAFVR.
1227515 J. Sword, RAFVR.
1124693 G. E. Talbot, RAFVR.
1158004 H. Taylor, RAFVR.
984493 P. G. Taylor, RAFVR.
150418 R. L. Taylor, RAFVR.
1164021 E. W. Thomas, RAFVR.
1418093 S. E. Thomas, RAFVR.
1175047 T. B. Thomas, RAFVR.
1541495 F. Thorp, RAFVR.
1496846 H. Tilling, RAFVR.
1282990 I. S. Treherne, RAFVR.
1486910 J. H. Trotter, RAFVR.
1405762 G. S. Truman, RAFVR.
1195137 R. T. Truman, RAFVR.
1084216 W. Tunna, RAFVR.
1207975 A. C. Turner, RAFVR.
944217 R. P. B. Udall, RAFVR.
746436 D. Vaughan, RAFVR.
1201471 A. D. B. Waddie, RAFVR.
1507555 J. G. Walker, RAFVR.
1634504 V. G. Walker, RAFVR.
1261519 C. H. Ward, RAFVR.
1291276 F. Ward, RAFVR.
1475238 P. Waring, RAFVR.
1404004 G. C. Warren, RAFVR.
1629482 R. S. Watkins, RAFVR.
1178540 J. H. Watson, RAFVR.
1060124 H. W. Watson, RAFVR.
1484405 J. W. Webster, RAFVR.
944265 R. Webster, RAFVR.
1371140 G. A. Weddell, RAFVR.
552296 C. E. Wedgewood.
916612 A. C. Wellstood, RAFVR.
1101272 R. Welsh, RAFVR.
1192535 E. West, RAFVR.
964564 H. G. West, RAFVR.
1166989 C. Westbrook, RAFVR.
1007497 F. Westhead, RAFVR.
1236876 E. C. Wheeler, RAFVR.
1270018 J. S. Whiting, RAFVR.
1099759 L. E. White, RAFVR.
1224460 V. R. Willey, RAFVR.
1296238 A. A. Williams, RAFVR.
1659566 D. R. H. Williams, RAFVR.
1424331 G. H. Williams, RAFVR.
1379545 L. Williams, RAFVR.
1353562 L. J. Williams, RAFVR.
1727080 G. H. Willis, RAFVR.
951605 C. Wilson, RAFVR.
1307059 P. J. W. Winslow, RAFVR.
1534448 J. E. Wood, RAFVR.
1092686 C. F. Woodward, RAFVR.
1152231 J. C. Woodward, RAFVR.
1473164 S. C. Woolmer, RAFVR.
1090280 D. J. Worrall, RAFVR.
1464795 F. C. E. Wright, RAFVR.
1092585 T. W. Wrightson, RAFVR.
1511415 C. L. Wyatt, RAFVR.
1147415 C. P. Wyles, RAFVR.
1554693 R. Wylie, RAFVR.
1480529 R. D. J. Wythes, RAFVR.
1616227 K. B. Yates, RAFVR.
1466151 J. Yearley, RAFVR.
1172208 C. J. W. Young, RAFVR.

Aircraftmen 1st Class

1142054 S. A. Alletson, RAFVR.
1113742 G. A. Amy, RAFVR.
1191859 T. F. Bamkin (deceased), RAFVR.
1535684 R. Banks, RAFVR.
1546992 T. D. Barron, RAFVR.
1514669 W. H. Bathurst, RAFVR.
1442140 C. A. Beauchamp, RAFVR.
1519189 C. Bennett, RAFVR.
1501890 G. W. S. Billington, RAFVR.
1610238 V. W. J. Blake, RAFVR.
1095124 A. Bradshaw, RAFVR.
1020037 E. J. Britten, RAFVR.
1553766 J. Burnie, RAFVR.
1560530 V. Burton, RAFVR.
1689877 J. W. Butterworth, RAFVR.
1336210 G. P. Caley, RAFVR.
1578007 E. L. Cartwright, RAFVR.
1408848 P. R. Chappell, RAFVR.
1654901 R. I. Clayton, RAFVR.
1547836 A. Cooper, RAFVR.
1247572 P. J. W. Cooper, RAFVR.
563717 G. Darling, RAFVR.
1209303 W J. Davies, RAFVR.
1468083 G. A. Drummond, RAFVR.
1237500 N. J. Ellington, RAFVR.
1695086 L. Etherington, RAFVR.
1441032 J. Fennymore, RAFVR.
1407008 E. G. French, RAFVR.
1440211 A. C. M. Froud, RAFVR.
1508917 O. Gardner, RAFVR.
1286378 L. W. Gibbins, RAFVR.
984024 R. Graham, RAFVR.
1344955 J. Grant, RAFVR.
1277167 R. Griffiths, RAFVR.
1694371 L. Gunning, RAFVR.
1201818 B. A. E. Hall, RAFVR.
1628095 C. J. Heasman, RAFVR.
1402148 J. Hill, RAFVR.

1647787 R. A. Hill, RAFVR.
1486107 S. Hobbins, RAFVR.
1711767 L. F. Holmes, RAFVR.
1038570 W. E. J. Hudson, RAFVR.
1275001 E. Hunter, RAFVR.
1174363 R. W. Isaac, RAFVR.
1025258 K. J. Jackson, RAFVR.
1229356 R. Jewell, RAFVR.
1314814 L. Lammiman, RAFVR.
1453028 G. McDonald, RAFVR.
119231 G. McMahon, RAFVR.
778146 S. A. MacMaster, RAFVR.
1537277 R. H. Mellor, RAFVR.
1668557 V. A. Mikkelson, RAFVR.
1190628 C. T. Moore, RAFVR.
1118536 J. C. Mowat, RAFVR.
1690965 E. Oliver, RAFVR.
1158709 G. B. Oliver, RAFVR.
1461654 F. H. Philpot, RAFVR.
1472254 S. Range, RAFVR.
1036589 T. Rogan, RAFVR.
1207049 D. J. Ryder, RAFVR.
1226734 G. L. Salter, RAFVR.
1553506 J. P. Samson, RAFVR.
1835910 A. Starforth, RAFVR.
1460605 H. E. Sturgeon, RAFVR.
1465376 H. J. Thomas, RAFVR.
1034233 E. Thompson, RAFVR.
1630036 S. F. Thraves, RAFVR.
1113617 G. E. Tindall, RAFVR.
1408834 T. Verrinder, RAFVR.
1654618 K. E. Waite, RAFVR.
1096786 W. P. Walden, RAFVR.
1643900 D. E. Ward, RAFVR.
1025409 H. Wharton, RAFVR.
1447101 L. Whitehouse, RAFVR.
1340959 J. McD. Wilson, RAFVR.

Aircraftmen 2nd Class

1563864 A. Baird, RAFVR.
1274484 A. G. S. Beare, RAFVR.
1666636 L. G. Bishop, RAFVR.
1697264 H. Cotton, RAFVR.
1236202 A. E. F. Dudley, RAFVR.
2210399 J. J. P. Durkin, RAFVR.
1317756 E. G. M. Ellis, RAFVR.
1493872 T. Hilton, RAFVR.

1342254 R. Laurie, RAFVR.
1021144 W. T. Norman, RAFVR.
2208423 J. Parker, RAFVR.
1629698 J. Pooley, RAFVR.
1564030 J. Russell, RAFVR.
1642335 J. Wilson, RAFVR.
1824773 G. Winders, RAFVR.

Princess Mary's Royal Air Force Nursing Service
Acting Senior Sister
K. D. Johnson (5052).

Sisters
J. Barber (5242).
D. M. Lawson (5654).

Women's Auxiliary Air Force
Group Officer
M. L. Crowther, 

Acting Wing Officers
M. C. Loftus (229).
F. A. J. Wreford (549).

Squadron Officers
M. J. G. Buchanan (268).
J. M. Entwisle (316).

Acting Squadron Officer
L. H. Rankin (563).

Flight Officers

M. E. U. Allen (346).
M. I. Cooper (1519).
C. A. Debenham (981).
Lady E. Freeman (5928).
K. M. L. Glennie (1602).
P. M. Hanford (1490).
E. F. Harker (179).
J. L. M. Henderson (526).

A. McW. McCurrach (1493).
F. M. Newman (261).
L. E. Nicolson (1069).
M. A. Richmond (2316).
A. M. Shepherd (1556).
P. E. Stephenson (4475).
B. M. Thomson (986).
L. A. Wilson (491).

Acting Flight Officers

J. C. Alldis (1901).
D. Bevan (3157).
G. E. Emmerson (2908).
J. C. Gallante (2991).
M. N. A. K. Hooper (6151).
P. A. Hugill (619).
C. Jones (2082).

B. M. Lucas (2555).
D. D. Paton (2176).
F. R. Pentland (2805).
D. J. N. Percy (2781).
J. M. C. Pusinelli (1966).
E. A. C. Robson (2283).

Section Officers

E. M. Ainslie (4409).
D. E. Attridge (5482).
D. Aye-Moung (6520).
E. L. Barsham (5188).
M. C. Baum (4411).
A. V. Bennett (4027).
B. W. Bird (6401).
J. M. Brotherton (2911).
W. D. Buckley (4904).
D. P. Dey (4033).
M. P. Downes (2404).
S. M. S. Elvins (4766).
L. M. Fenn (4657).
P. Fraser (3444).
B. Garrow (5791).
F. Gillespie (6545).
F. M. Goddard (6474).
J. B. A. Gow (4042).
A. N. Grant (657).
E. Hare (1326).
E. W. Harris (3584).

M. E. Hart (3857).
K. E. Hayward (4494).
J. Hewett (2369).
M. A. Loud (3452).
P. Lyons-Montgomery (3033).
M. E. McKie (2221).
F. M. C. Maxfield (5069).
P. B. Millar (5148).
E. M. O'Shaughnessy (5246).
D. K. Powlett (5749).
J. W. Sharp (5811).
H. K. M. J. Smith (3601).
M. Thomas (4882).
I. M. Till (6091).
B. D. Toule (3834).
P. E. Twells (4099).
G. M. Vaughan (4548).
P. L. G. Wait (1271).
M. M. Wheelhouse (3333).
E. A. Wilson (610).

Assistant Section Officer
O. M. King (7389).

Warrant Officers

F. A. B. Bishop (890250).
B. V. Collins (890499).

D. M. Mackenzie (880466).
J. O'Dowd (887693).

Flight Sergeants

893952 J. Baker.
893653 D. Blundy.
887704 L. B. Bonsor.
889516 N. I. Dixon.
890690 E. Emeny.
886275 C. M. Lanham.

881746 M. E. Lewis.
884885 N. Marsh.
887360 M. M. Murch.
886812 H. K. Nicholson.
893754 B. A. Weaver.

Sergeants

895405 G. E. Applebee.
439300 R. Atkins.
440402 L. W. M. Baldwin.
2040185 C. B. Ballantyne.
896515 C. E. E. Bell.
447023 E. M. Berryman.
427000 G. A. H. Buckman.
891945 L. C. Chamberlain.
424763 A. J. Channing.
423680 D. Clay.
889608 P. E. A. Clay.
2050367 W. K. Cockcroft.
421519 G. Copas.
427874 M. H. Danby.
880676 S. M. Dawson.
883640 M. D. Easson.
437608 J. Ellis.
447415 V. A. Fox.
2049194 W. M. Gummersall.
2000674 P. Haining.
442321 E. Harrison.

891802 M. F. M. Harrison.
420536 B. Jones.
892056 B. L. Kelley.
895112 L. Leake.
883294 S. M. Leonard.
894424 D. Lodge.
2083574 B. Molyneux.
896833 N. A. North.
423151 M. E. Oliver.
889935 J. M. Owen.
421168 A. A. Raffan.
421176, E. D. Rogers.
892622 F. M. Royffe.
446034 D. G. Shute.
447573 L. Smith.
443001 O. A. Sowden.
440302 I. A. Sparkes.
423123 J. Stringer.
428653 C. B. M. Thompson.
420478 D. M. Toas.
424682 C. M. Wahlstrand.

Acting Sergeant
449528 J. K. Parfitt.

Corporals

2091746 P. Allan.
2141350 B. Arkell.
434010 O. G. Armstrong.
425947 D. E. Arnold.
887261 M. I. Baldwin.
2060774 J. Beardsley.
420931 J. Bodsworth.
2006055 K. N. L Boxall.
2047780 J. L. H. Boyd.
2001494 L. Clabburn.
428742 R. O. Clarke.
2052249 D. E. Coopland.
892369 H. C. Corey.
2021930 M. M. Craker.
2056288 D. A. Crawford.
423741 M. J. Davies.
890315 M. D. De Glanville.
2013480 J. J. Disney.
2081708 H. E. Dobson.
2002937 S. Donnelly.
422681 M. W. Du Vergier.
462595 E. Earnshaw.
2043442 H. J. Elgin.
2049056 J. M. Farrow.
2005304 V. J. Felton.
422972 E. G. Ford.
434404 M. A. Foster.
2098584 E. M. Fowler.
452901 G. A. Gauzey.
894162 B. J. G. Gibbons.
2026046 A. M. Gibson.
433662 I. M. Gilmour.
2000232 I. A. Green.
430748 J. M. Greenwood.
448058 G. C. B. Groves.
436970 D. A. Hardy.
2001395 K. J. Harris.
2055579 P. Heard.
2038122 E. S. Henderson.
2000553 G. N. Hern.
2096282 M. Hetherington.
2091312 D. Hobson.
894015 L. Howarth.
432443 M. W. Hoye.
2028430 M. A. Husband.

2021851 D. E. Inggall.
2089802 C. F. Iveson.
2065124 M. James.
443453 I. O. M. Johnson.
2079104 G. H. Jones.
2070640 B. V. Kay.
2005329 E. B. Kemp.
445821 J. Kenna.
897112 E. L. King.
2068413 P. M. Knights.
460076 C. M. Latter.
443637 V. M. Lear.
431992 A. M. McPhail.
2102679 L. D. May.
2009654 E. G. Mowberry.
2097036 J. Mulholland.
423672 B. Parkin.
443013 E. W. Pettit.
444634 M. A. Phillips.
2053028 P. M. Price.
424748 A. E. Prior.
450295 M. O. Quinnell.
2023318 E. Rickman.
2062193 J. H. Roberts.
420551 M. Sedgwick.
460312 M. Shaw.
451151 D. B. Simmqnds.
2003523 B. C. Skelt.
450916 B. C. Sleath.
2044103 M. H. Smart.
2016838 R. I. A. M. Smith.
2068611 A. J. Somerset.
2002474 F. M. Stewart.
433248 A. E. Stoddart.
20612911. M. Straw.
2042025 N. Swanson.
446137 G. M. Thomas.
443675 E. Vaughan.
2002770 D. J. Wallis.
887426 J. J. Waters.
882666 M. W. Whitelaw.
432334 S. T. T. Winter.
435554 A. R. Worthy.
2087140 J. M. Wright.
2036242 M. S. Wydell.

Acting Corporal
449060 B. S. Martin.

Leading Aircraftwomen

2130157 R. A. Abrahams.
2068558 W. E. Allen.
2041563 M. T. Alston.
2044911 A. Anderson.
2021925 C. E. Ansell.
431611 K. L. Baggaley.
2011109 F. A. Baker.
2059927 M. D. Baker.
2074986 H. McD. Baxter.
473648 D. Bilton.
2078038 B. Boone.
2010763 M. J. Botwright.
2054881 M. Bown.
2013171 E. M. Bracey.
2005821 B. Bromhead.
442977 E. F. Brooker.
2064079 B. Buck.
2002626 G. M. A. Bury.
442023 P. Butt.
435518 K. M. Cheney.
460975 M. Churchward.
2087330 H. Clarke.
445433 K. M. Clarke.
2010362 G. E. Coakley.
2081151 W. Collins.
2082542 E. Cosgrove.
435630 J. Cousins.
2017246 M. Cracknell.
2073670 C. M. Davies.
2075988 J. M. Davison.
470653 I. Dyson.
2085253 M. J. Edge.
474650 A. J. Enstice.
2007651 R. M. Evans.
428832 P. A. Fenwick.
2044769 H. D. M. Forbes.
2097820 E. Forsyth.
431190 A. Gartland.
2045602 M. B. Gordon.
2038843 J. Grindell.
2008195 M. Gunston.
449374 J. E. Hancock.
2096003 J. Harvey.
2049156 W. Heald.
462052 E. Hibbert.
449484 J. T. Holmes.
477171 C. W. Holt.
2081414 M. E. Huband.
460050 M. Isbill.

429759 E. G. James.
2050867 A. B. Jowett.
2135503 C. B. Joy.
2058979 J. E. Knaggs.
2015922 B. N. Knight.
471384 S. M. Lamford.
2060905 M. Lawrence.
2064107 J. L. Lee.
2000165 S. A. Lee.
2066253 M. L. Lethbridge.
2033603 J. C. Lindus.
2105503 M. T. Lofthouse.
2000149 N. G. C. Major.
2034871 O. Manning.
2137802 M. D. Martin.
2088485 M. Mason.
2056502 M. Morgan.
2001118 I. G. Palmer.
2055769 V. Peacock.
2039145 J. Percival.
2007701 J. M. Pinner.
2021989 F. P. M. Reay.
2093119 N. Reay.
2002627 S. Record.
2091069 A. Richardson.
2025020 P. Richmond.
2031431 D. B. Ridge.
2054290 M. Roads.
454702 E. A. Rowlands.
474811 C. H. Shipley.
428424 P. F. Simpson.
437637 M. A. Steel.
20000311. M. Taylor.
458286 D. E. Thacker.
885845 N. M. Theis.
462647 J. C. Thomas.
2064771 D. M. Uff.
437334 C. I. Wallis.
2067651 D. M. Warring.
2093803 E. M. Wells.
2084153 J. E. Whitfield.
2014232 A. M. Willis.
2045605 M. Wilson.
442295 M. E. Witcomb.

Aircraftwomen 1st Class

459275 J. M. R. Body.
2011262 M. Brown.
2037732 L. B. Clark.
478060 E. Davey.
2076386 E. A. Davies.
2087405 C. Dougherty.
2033145 D. Fuller.
2092405 A. Hood.

2127027 F. R. Lambert.
2025253 E. P. Nicholl.
2035191 D. A. M. Rushmer.
461819 M. Sanderson.
2137871 J. I. Saynor.
2111284 K. Smith.
461053 E. D. Young.

Aircraftwomen 2nd Class

2141198 L. L. Bass.
487985 H. A. B. Blake.
2080482 E. M. Harrison.
2044113 L. Johnson.

2141505 I. M. Justice.
485199 A. E. Gates.
478038 J. C. Palmer.
2057825 E. Wilson.

Royal Navy
Lieutenants
P. Dallas-Smith.
G. W. Styles, .

Chief Petty Officer
PJ16259 E. J. Gray.

Royal Australian Air Force
Air Commodore
F. M. Bladin, .

Group Captain
J. Alexander, .

Wing Commander
R. Holmes (Aus.406356).

Squadron Leader
C. G. Stebbing (Aus.407880).

Acting Squadron Leaders

R. D. J. Baird (Aus.405119).
J. Catanach, (Aus.400364) (deceased).
J. Clark (Aus.402439).
F. M. Critchley, (Aus.404574).
W. F. Diddams (Aus.400529).

W. H. Fishburn (Aus.15673).
R. G. Foskett (Aus.402652).
E. A. Hudson, (Aus.404506).
L. V. Hudson (Aus.400448).
A. Wharton, (Aus.404556).

Flight Lieutenants

G. L. Barnard (Aus.263132).
C. Carmichael (Aus.403024).
G. R. Champion (Aus.14965).
R. C. Chessell (Aus.292254).
C. D. Colling (Aus.263359).
B. G. Eddell (Aus.267446).
B. C. W. Fogg (Aus.405271).
R. de V. Gipps (Aus.405404).
G. R. Henderson (Aus.400798).
R. V. Kierath (Aus.402364) (deceased).
D. R. Law (Aus.403140).

B. J. McSharry (Aus.404710).
R. M. Mitchell (Aus.407092).
G. Roberts (Aus.3189).
J. D. Robertshaw (Aus.402399).
H. Spencer (Aus.3396).
W. J. Storey, (Aus.400508).
R. L. C. Stuart (Aus.401197).
G. O. Watson (Aus.406745).
J. G. P. Weatherlake (Aus.404944).
E. J. Woosley (Aus.404127).

Acting Flight Lieutenants

L. C. Deignan (Aus.404808).
C. T. Harper (Aus.416959).
S. B. Harry (Aus.287412).

R. C. W. Humble (Aus.416441).
L. E. Short, (Aus.403382).

Flying Officers

C. J. Bastian (Aus.404475).
A. P. Bowman (Aus.40488).
A. E. Gaze (Aus.410480).
D. E. Griffiths (Aus.401945).
A. A. Heslop (Aus.9226).

H. T. Kennedy (Aus.422573).
V. A. Lancaster (Aus.409149).
J. R. Linton (Aus.421739).
J. E. Sheehan (Aus.2332).
R. B. Tuff (Aus.409257) (deceased).

Pilot Officers

E. T. Hall (Aus.406976).
H. G. Hardy (Aus.407506).
P. J. Hedderwick (Aus.401950).

F. V. Murphy (Aus.411075).
J. Quirk (Aus.400124).

Warrant Officers

E. G. Connor (Aus.412609).
T. P. Druhan (Aus.403455).
A. H. Hake (Aus.403218) (deceased).
I. C. Jones (Aus.401696).
T. G. Perry (Aus.407739).

R. W. Raebel (Aus.5140).
C. W. Richards (Aus.402296).
D. C. Sidney (Aus.402617).
A. L. White (Aus.407265).

Acting Warrant Officer
J. A. Lenney (Aus.14297).

Flight Sergeants

Aus.16990 F. G. Collins.
Aus.425625 R. R. Eadie.
Aus.22182 R. A. Everest.
Aus.300377 M. W. D. Firth.
Aus.425636 R. W. George.
Aus.3510 W. B. Granger.
Aus.4822 R. G. Moore.

Aus.411256 G. A. Pratt.
Aus.5737 C. C. B. Renshaw.
Aus.413428 R. Richards.
Aus.420597 A. J. Robertson.
Aus.8251 J. McI. Saunders.
Aus.9399 H. Tickle.
Aus.8117 F. H. Wood.

Sergeants

Aus.26471 I. A. Adams.
Aus.10723 R. C. Archer.
Aus.15069 H. Blundell.
Aus.16657 M. A. Cahill.
Aus.24099 H. W. Campbell.
Aus.3760 R. H. Castleton.
Aus.21241 B. R. Dalby.
Aus.25130 H. E. Eastgate.
Aus.21183 J. F. Fussell.
Aus.22736 F. Gilmore.
Aus.6727 C. E. Hall.

Aus.32976 L. J. Henry.
Aus.19081 J. P. Lynch.
Aus.10665 A. J. Morris.
Aus.16648 F. S. Pearce.
Aus.27949 J. H. Pile
Aus.9417 R. Tier.
Aus.15781 W. J. Watts.
Aus.12176 T. G. Wilbraham.
Aus.408548 J. Wood.
Aus.405001 M. J. Wyllie (deceased).
Aus.9301 I. M. Yeates.

Acting Sergeant
Aus.22695 L. R. Mcpherson.

Corporals

Aus.3296 A. K. Dadd.
Aus.22525 J. H. Foster.
Aus.8731 F. Skillington.

Aus.11452 W. W. Stark.
Aus.14799 A. E. Tilso.
Aus.15179 G. A. Warnes.

Aircraftman 1st Class
Aus.44671 F. M. Franklin.

Royal Canadian Air Force
Air Commodore
C. M. K. McEwen, .

Acting Air Commodore
B. F. Johnson.

Group Captain
M. Costello.

Acting Group Captains

D. A. R. Bradshaw, .
H. M. Carscallen, .
R. C. Gordon.
W. A. Jones.

E. H. G. Moncrieff, .
G. E. M. Scott.
D. M. Smith.

Acting Wing Commanders

M. Brown (Can/C.1267).
C. W. Palmer, (Can/J.15818).
J. W. Reid (Can/C.927).

C. G. Ruttan (Can/C.871).
C. C. Sparling (Can/C.1957).
J. W. Whyte (Can/C.4079).

Acting Squadron Leaders

K. B. Andras (Can/C.6511).
F. G. Botsford (Can/C.7878).
A. H. C. Bruce (Can/C.7262).
D. D. Carr-Harris (Can/C.2356).
H. C. Givins (Can/C.4379).
W. R. F. Grierson-Jackson, (Can/J.5683).
A. D. Hamilton (Can/C.4990).
G. F. Jenkins (Can/C.2189).
T. M. Jones (Can/J.15168).

R. J. Leaman (Can/C.2722).
W. J. C. MacArthur (Can/C.5466).
W. N. F. McLean (Can/C.3228).
W. L. Marshall (Can/C.3373).
D. G. Miller (Can/C.6628).
R. F. Miller (Can/J.15481).
J. Pennington (Can/J.8600).
L. J. White (Can/J.5993).

Flight Lieutenants

G. C. Beacock (Can/C.11994).
H. Birkland (Can/5.5233) (deceased).
W. N. Gibbens (Can/C.3552).
F. W. Hallwood (Can/J.8755).
C. A. Holmquist (Can./C.3404).
G. A. Kidder (Can/J.10177) (deceased).
P. W. Langford (Can/C.1631) (deceased).
G. E. McGill (Can/J.5312) (deceased).

N. V. St. C. Martin (Can/J.9514).
W. F. Miles (Can/J.4153).
J. H. R. Reginbal (Can/J.10149).
H. A. Stackhouse (Can/J.9414).
L. G. Virr (Can/C.987).
J. C. Wernham (Can/J.6144) (deceased).
G. W. Wiley (Can/J.7234) (deceased).
A. Wilson (Can/5.7524).

Acting Flight Lieutenants

A. B. Carveth (Can/C.11734).
C. A. E. Danis (Can/C.8446).
T. K. Draimin (Can/C.16015).
J. P. A. Faguy (Can/J.15381).
J. A. Irwin (Can/C.7490).
R. J. Jones (Can/J.11550).
W. A. Jones (Can/J.9851).
L. A. Justason (Can/C.8738).
P. G. F. Money (Can/C.9837).

M. A. Mussell (Can/J.9661).
W. J. Osborne (Can/C.7962).
A. R. H. Riley (Can/C.7717).
W. Seller (Can/C.7407).
P. E. Spence (Can/J.16535).
E. J. Strathdee (Can/C.9292).
W. S. Thomson (Can/C.9378).
H. J. Walker (Can/C.9222).
E. H. M. Walsh (Can/J.s088).

Flying Officers

P. M. Anderson, (Can/J.16379).
D. C. Appleton (Can/J.18563).
T. E. Bach (Can/J.22560).
N. Brown (Can/J.16839).
G. A. M. Bryenton (Can/J.16522).
J. S. Clifford (Can/J.17312).
C. H. E. Cook (Can/J.16670).
J. F. Evans (Can/C.10936).
H. Forrest (Can/J.16900).
G. R. Harris (Can/J.14193).
M. Harrison (Can/C.20089).
R. W. Holman (Can/J.18836).
N. S. B. Hull (Can/J.15753).
H. E. Jackson (Can/J.16977).
R. J. Leet (Can/J.16962).

J. W. R. Macfarlane (Can/J.16752).
P. A. Oleskevis (Can/C.16028).
G. Ovens (Can/J.15676).
W. M. Roberts (Can/J.17046).
R. R. Ross (Can/J.10006).
H. A. Schartz (Can/C.13308).
S. G. Sherman (Can/J.17360).
R. J. Sherrett (Can/J.17048).
T. W. Simpson (Can/J.12681).
J. H. T. Snow (Can/J.10888).
R. L. B. Townsend (Can/C.15974).
H. S. Vandewater (Can/J.16735).
J. V. Watson (Can/J.17301).
W. G. Wilson (Can/J.11215).
R. E. Woods (Can/J.16183).

Pilot Officers

E. L. Bulman (Can/J.18603).
H. H. Farmer (Can/J.17773).
L. L. H. Hansen (Can/J.18692).
J. G. Kiljour (Can/J.17842).

J. B. Macdougall (Can/C.18114).
G. L. Spencer (Can/J.16834).
A. C. Turner (Can/C.17967).
C. Weaver, (Can/J.18784).

Warrant Officers

G. C. Blair (Can/R.100088).
W. R. Bluett (Can/R.98770).
E. E. Davison (Can/R.95662).
V. A. Donaldson (Can/R.128688).
H. E. Finn (Can/R.11602).
W. P. Foster (Can/R.114420).

L. Kirkwood (Can/R.87872).
E. H. Monture (Can/R.78918).
W. J. W. Parker (Can/R.10042).
G. C. Pienaar (Can/R.328553V).
W. H. Webb (Can/R.129348).

Acting Warrant Officer
J. E. Tobin (Can/R.88116).

Flight Sergeants

Can/R.64767 W. E. Bursey.
Can/2202 S. H. E. Calver.
Can/R.130024 D. H. Griese.
Can/R.14011A L. A. Harvey.
Can/R.107485 A. E. Holton.
Can/R.51738 W. McCullough.
Can/R.83946 J. E. McGillivray.
Can/7642 J. M. E. Mimeault.

Can/R.53312 C. T. Raymond.
Can/R.64154 H. W. Ridge.
Can/7486 F. J. McC. Sullivan.
Can/R.109729 N. D. Weisberg.
Can/4358A C. E. Whitehead.
Can/R.88851 W. J. Wilson.
Can/R.12209A W. M. Young.

Acting Flight Sergeants

Can/2630 H. G. Goudis.
Can/R.80139 A. J. Heale.

Can/R.92867 R. I. Stirling.
Can/R.99538 R. O. Whitaker.

Sergeants

Can/R.87967 J. J. Allman.
Can/R.98184 C. R. Belyea.
Can/R.107015 G. W. Bowman.
Can/R.85068 G. W. Browell.
Can/R.92486 R. K. Burgar.
Can/R.152875 R. A. G. De Pape.
Can/R.88226 G. Fanning.
Can/R.82647 J. Frigon.
Can/R.139973 W. H. Golding.
Can/R.101729 J. L. Heywood.
Can/R.143172 R. P. Husband.
Can/R.94605 C. C. McAlpine.
Can/R.109745 H. E. McCulloch.

Can/R.50155 H. A. Morton.
Can/R.141439 L. J. E. Moses.
Can/R.97138 J. L. Pearson.
Can/R.72370 C. Phillips.
Can/R.63605 H. M. Robertson (deceased).
Can/R.107275 B. C. Shannon.
Can/R.97052 S. R. Sharrard.
Can/R.60138 F. A. Smith.
Can/R.59257 J. S. Stevenson.
Can/R.68436 L. C. Sylvester.
Can/R.73831 H. E. Thornicroft.
Can/R.106438 R. S. Webb.
Can/R.59491 G. Wolfe.

Corporals

Can/R.108937 W. J. Ainslie.
Can/R.132765 M. A. Burke.
Can/R.69735 L. Burrows.
Can/R.112066 P. W. Butler.
Can/R.153977 R. J. Chisholm.

Can/R.58030 F. J. Hart.
Can/R.160379 J. W. Kressler.
Can/R.129701 J. A. Larocque.
Can/R.85059 S. C. Loree.
Can/R.59185 W. McCowan.

Leading Aircraftmen

Can/R.172292 E. C. Akhurst.
Can/R.118718 F. Banner.
Can/R.140181 A. W. Beattie.
Can/R.54955 C. F. Champion.
Can/R.107819 F. W. Forsberg.
Can/R.75278 E. R. Ganong.

Can/R.167496 J. C. Gordon.
Can/R.89453 E. D. Hillen.
Can/R.180789 M. J. R. Lachance.
Can/R.173038 T. L. Mather.
Can/R.83287 I. Troup.

Aircraftman 1st Class
Can/R.154573 R. McK. Jones.

Flying Officer
Nursing Sister D. C. Pitkethly (Can/C.6352).

Royal Canadian Air Force (Women's Division)
Section Officer
E. H. Ayton (767).

Assistant Section Officer
L. G. Simons (V.30582).

Corporals
W.301493 L. Hall.
W.301327 H. F. Ledingham.

Royal New Zealand Air Force
Acting Wing Commander
R. Webb, (N.Z.391853).

Acting Squadron Leaders

R. O. Calvert (N.Z.404890).
W. R. Gellatly (N.Z.40563).
B. M. Gilmour, (N.Z.412224).

I. H. Hanlon (N.Z.404463).
G. K. Silcock, (N.Z.411461).

Flight Lieutenant
A. G. Christensen (N.Z.413380) (deceased).

Acting Flight Lieutenants

F. C. Jones (N.Z.403606).
I. G. E. McPhail (N.Z.402203).
L. J. Montgomerie (N.Z.412377).

A. H. Smith (N.Z.411947).
D. C. Stewart (N.Z.40990).

Flying Officers

G. A. Bice (N.Z.404131).
R. R. G. Fisher (N.Z.412671).
F. C. Fox (N.Z.40762).
R. M. Grant (N.Z.413839) (deceased).
W. C. K. Hender (N.Z.412690).

H. D. Holtom (N.Z.403604).
J. M. Pearson (N.Z.40986).
P. P. J. Poke (N.Z.402894) (deceased).
A. Prenter (N.Z.42306).
D. W. Thomson, (N.Z.41613).

Pilot Officers
W. F. Morice (N.Z.415708).
L. S. McQ. White (N.Z.413919).

Flight Sergeants
N.Z.412675 N. D. Freeman.
N.Z.413265 D. E. McKenzie.
N.Z.412737 A. H. Sowerby.

Sergeant
N.Z.411653 S. J. Salt.

South African Air Force
Lieutenant-Colonels.
E. G. Catton, (P.97407).
G. N. McBlain, (2029847).

Majors

A. G. Crowther (481797).
O. G. Davies, (102986).
J. H. R. Eastwood (533337V).

H. J. T. Sheldon (97557)
C. A. Van Vliet, (1027477).
E. B. Woodrow, (1029947).

Captains

W. B. M. Barron (329550).
W. R. Brighton (P.3297).
L. W. Frewen (2410147).
G. N. Hulett (2028967).

B. A. Jenkinson (995917).
E. Jones (989837).
R. N. Purvis (137112).
R. C. Sanders (47859).

Lieutenants

G. D. Abernethy (1029107).
K. P. Gordon (1023577).
J. S. Gouns (103275) (deceased).
A. E. T. Lord (927507).
V. S. Muir (V.83638).

M. I. Shore (3282707).
R. J. Stevens (47431) (deceased).
J. J. de Villiers (1351837).
R. P. Waterson (961677).

2nd Lieutenants
J. A. Hallas (V.98899).
F. C. A. N. McGarr (956912) (deceased).

Flight Sergeants

96790V E. A. Amiel.
P.4771V V. J. Coupar.
P.5393V N. F. Furrows.

31688V A. H. Hayward.
94208V A. S. M. De Lange.
100094V A. W. H. Sternslow.

Air Sergeants

P.4830 G. F. Bellville.
96273V J. W. Chamkins.
29002V L. M. Hartley.

99289V E. J. Waller.
96096V N. E. Whittle.

Air Corporals

100260V W. Freel.
52845V R. Henderson.
1215 Z. Ismail.
97693V W. L. Lawler.

336375V J. E. Northern.
96691V S. Roux.
98912V H. F. D. Smart.
206932V C. P. A. Van Rooyen.

Air Mechanics

96075 J. A. Gautier.
221645V J. Kennedy.
P.7038V J. A. Pounden.

P.5969V J. J. Smit.
101659V F. E. Welgemoed.

Private
3428 I. Daniel.

South African Women's Auxiliary Air Force
Major
M. A. Smith (F.46624V).

2nd Lieutenant
B. A. H. Hare (F.46384V).

Flight Sergeants
F.262812V J. E. Campbell.
F.263256V M. J. Esterhuysen.

Air Sergeant
F.262708V M. E. Findlay.

Air Corporals
F.262494V E. M. McNally.
F.264213V J. H. Wolfaardt.

Indian Air Force
Flying Officer
M. W. R. Desai, Ind.1794.

Corporal
Ind.13171 P. P. V. Samuel.

Artificers, 1st Class

Ind.3053 Conception.
Ind.3188 Habibullah.
Ind.3080 J. Lanson.
Ind.3007 G. Nabi.

Ind.3578 D. Singh.
Ind.3281 G. Singh.
Ind.3488 M. Singh.

Indian Women's Auxiliary Corps
Junior Commander
S. M. Kershaw.

RAF Levies
Lieutenant-Colonel
G. Peace, .

Majors

G. E. C. Hudson (52034).
D. B. Huxley (100288).

C. S. Pryor (76074).
A. J. Reaper (154001).

Captain.
W. Boyes (66773).

Lieutenants.
J. H. Andrew (104688).
A. R. Stewart(294590).

Warrant Officer 2nd Class
L. G. Goodsell (6280529).

Senior Sergeant
R. Fritchley (5047935)

Sergeant
R. J. Hill (7583882).

Rab Emma

L. Adam (X93).
M. Yacube (X42).
Y. Hassado (X16).

E. Gewergis (X9).
S. Oshana (X42).
W. Eshu (X18).

Rab Khamshi
A. Kader (X265).
A. Rathi (X168).

Rab Khaila
Z. Gewergis.

Rab Tremma
Y. Ismail (X1).
S. Paulos (X3).
Y. Khoshaba (X13).

Civilian
C. Cachia.

Royal New Zealand Air Force
Mentioned in despatches
Flight Lieutenant
G. A. Delves (N.Z.40757).

Flight Sergeant
N.Z.42441 D. K. Mulligan.

References

Birthday Honours
1944 awards
1944 in the United Kingdom
1944 in New Zealand
1944 in South Africa